= List of Vietnamese Americans =

This is a list of notable Vietnamese Americans.

To be included in this list, the person must have a Wikipedia article showing they are Vietnamese American, or must be cited in multiple independent and reliable sources showing they are Vietnamese American and are notable.

== Arts and entertainment ==
=== Actors and actresses ===
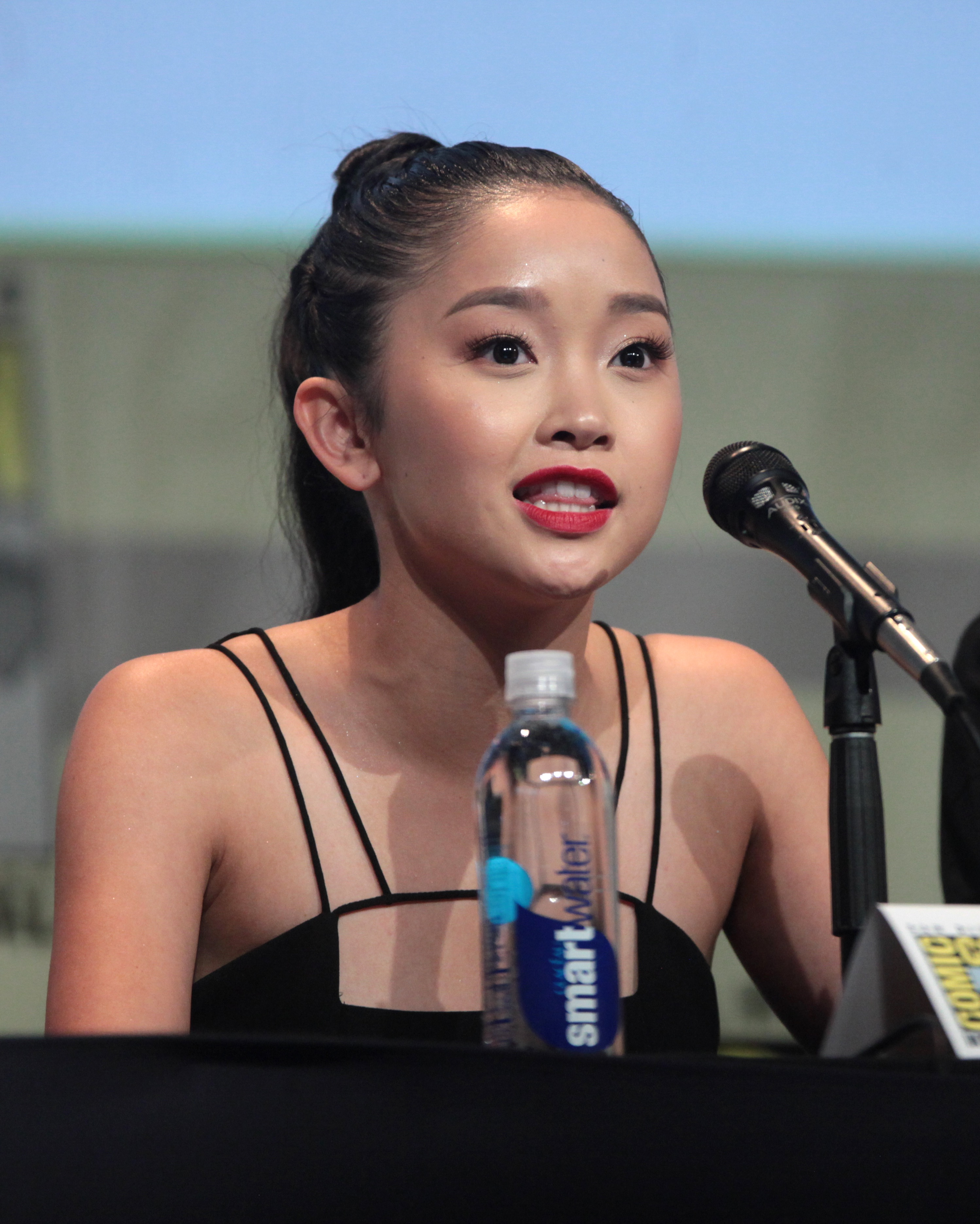
Lana Condor in 2015

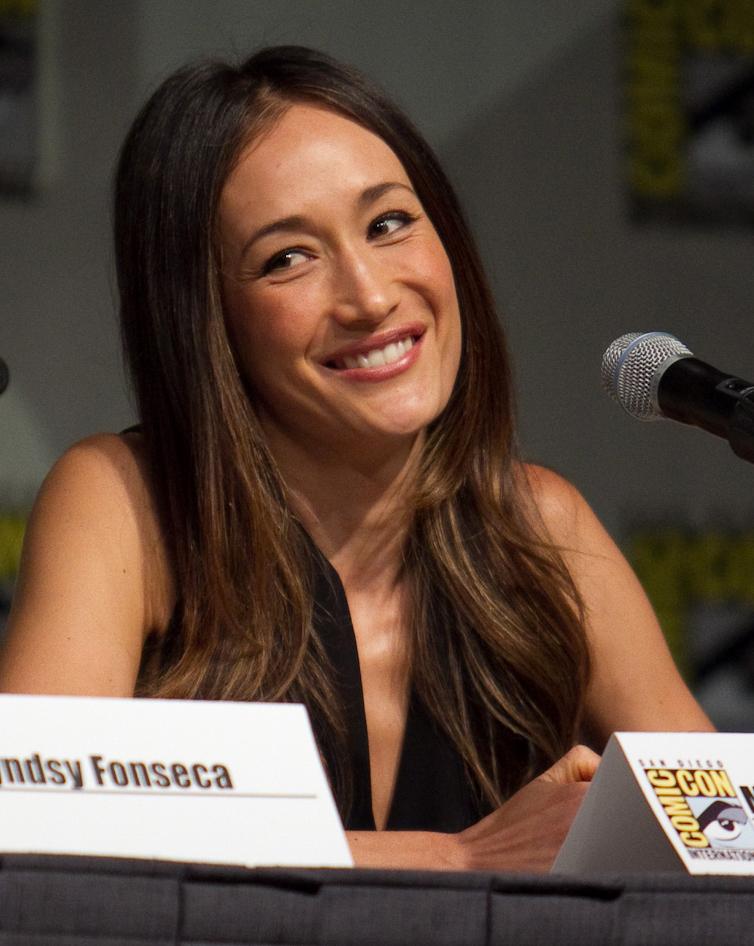
Maggie Q in 2010

- Kieu Chinh – actress, producer
- James Duval – actor
- Eileen Fogarty – actor, writer, and producer
- Lance Krall – actor
- Hiep Thi Le (1971–2017) – actress
- Jeannie Mai – makeup artist, fashion expert
- Dustin Nguyen – actor
- Olivia Munn – former model, TV personality
- Maggie Q – former model and actress
- Tiffany Pham – actress, model, author, and entrepreneur
- Ke Huy Quan – actor and stunt choreographer
- Chantal Thuy – actress
- Rosie Tran – writer, actress, and comedian
- Thuy Trang (1973–2001) – actress
- Kathy Uyen – actress, producer, and writer
- Xanthe Huynh – anime English voice actress
- Ali Wong – comedian, actress, and writer
- Lana Condor – actress
- Levy Tran – actress and model
- La Thoại Tân (1937–2008) – actor
- Kelly Marie Tran – actress
- Hong Chau – actress
- Loan Chabanol – actress
- Patti Harrison – actress, writer, and comedian
- Johnny Trí Nguyễn - action choreographer, film actor, martial artist
- Vyvan Pham – voice actress
- Kimlinh Tran – voice actress
- Thalia Tran – actress
- Tien Tran – actress
- Tiana Alexandra – actress and filmmaker
- Kim Mai Guest – voice actress
- Courtney Reed – actress
- Ian Alexander – actor
- Porter Duong – actress
- Todd Haberkorn – voice actor

=== Anchors and reporters ===
- Betty Nguyen – CBS Early Morning News anchor, former CNN anchor
- Mary Nguyen – reporter; first Asian-American Miss Teenage America
- Leyna Nguyen – anchor
- Vicky Nguyen – NBC Investigate and Consumer Correspondent
- Thuy Vu – anchor and reporter for CBS-5 Television in San Francisco
- Chau Nguyen – news anchor on KHOU TV

=== Directors and film crew ===
- Tim Dang – theatre director and actor
- Doan Hoang – director and producer
- Steve Nguyen – director and film producer
- Linh Nga – director and film producer
- Michael Dougherty – director/writer
- Ham Tran – director
- Derek Nguyen – writer/director
- Timothy Linh Bui - filmmaker, film producer, and screenwriter
- Tony Bui – film director
- Charlie Nguyễn – film director, screenwriter, and producer
- Victor Vu – film director, writer, and producer
- Chi Muoi Lo – actor, writer, and entrepreneur
- Nadine Truong – director, photographer
- Qui Nguyen – playwright, screenwriter, and director
- Thuc Doan Nguyen – filmmaker, screenwriter, producer
- Mike Nguyen Le – screenwriter, producer, and film director
- James Nguyen – filmmaker and director
- Bao Nguyen – director, producer
- Nguyễn Võ Nghiêm Minh – film director
- Tom Cross – film editor
- Vu T. Thu Ha – director, producer, conceptual artist

=== Musicians ===
- Trúc Hồ – songwriter, producer
- Như Quỳnh – singer
- Tyga – Vietnamese and Jamaican rapper
- Keshi – singer, songwriter, producer, and multi-instrumentalist
- Sierra Deaton – singer, songwriter, dancer
- Nguyễn Cao Kỳ Duyên – MC co-host
- Thanh Lan – singer, actress
- Minh Tuyết – singer
- Ý Lan – singer
- Don Hồ – singer
- Bao Vo – musician, singer-songwriter, composer
- Quang Lê – singer
- Thái Thanh – singer
- Khánh Ly – singer
- Thủy – independent singer-songwriter
- Thao Nguyen – singer-songwriter
- Trish Thuy Trang – singer-songwriter
- Lâm Nhật Tiến – pop singer
- V-Nasty – rapper
- Maliibu Miitch – rapper, singer
- Cuong Vu – jazz trumpeter and singer
- Sangeeta Kaur – singer, composer, producer
- Matt Nguyen – DJ, choreographer, dancer
- Quynh Nguyen – classical pianist
- Viet Cuong – composer
- Lynda Trang Dai – singer
- Phạm Phi Nhung – singer, humanitarian, and actress
- Thanh Hà – singer
- Sailorr – singer-songwriter
- Hana Vu – singer-songwriter
- Tila Tequila – singer

=== Artists, models, chefs, and other ===
- Daniel K. Winn – painter/sculptor
- Binh Danh – photographer
- Chloe Dao – fashion designer/winner of television show Project Runway
- Dat Phan – comedian, winner of first Last Comic Standing
- Jonas Bevacqua (1977–2011) – adopted Vietnamese American fashion designer
- Linda Le – cosplayer and model
- Hung Huynh – chef, Top Chef season 3 winner
- Tom Vu – infomercial icon, professional poker player, and real estate investor
- Christine Ha – chef, winner of MasterChef
- Phong Bui – artist and writer
- Truong Tran – poet, visual artist, teacher
- Bao Phi – artist, writer, and community activist
- Dan Lam – sculptor
- Cherie Roberts – photographer and model
- Khoi Vinh – graphic designer and blogger
- Binh Danh – artist known for chlorophyll prints and daguerreotypes
- Savannah Gankiewicz – model and beauty pageant titleholder
- Jenn Tran – television personality
- Thai Nguyen – fashion designer, television personality
- Christina Nguyen – chef and restaurateur
- Tuan Andrew Nguyen – artist known for moving-image works, sculptures, and installations
- Navia Nguyen – model, actress, and entrepreneur
- Ha Nguyen – costume designer
- Dinh Q. Lê – multimedia artist
- John Pham – comic creator
- Charles Phan – chef
- Ann Phong – painter
- Tam Pham – chef and co-owner of Tâm Tâm; 2024 MICHELIN Florida Young Chef Award winner
- Viet Pham – chef and winner of Iron Chef America
- Jack Lee – celebrity chef
- Thi Bui – graphic novelist and illustrator
- Peter Do – fashion designer
- Karrueche Tran – American model and actress
- Andrea Nguyen – food writer and cookbook author
- Vân Sơn – comedian, founder and director of Vân Sơn Entertainment

=== Social media influencers ===
- Michelle Phan – YouTuber
- Mina Le - fashion YouTuber, podcaster, and content creator
- Nikita Dragun – YouTuber, make-up artist, and model
- RiceGum - YouTuber and online streamer
- Cassey Ho – American social media fitness entrepreneur, YouTuber
- Sykkuno – YouTuber and live streamer
- Ryan Kaji – YouTuber; known for Ryan's World
- Haley Pham – YouTuber and writer

== Business ==
- Trung Dung – founder of OnDisplay, sold to Vignette Corporation in 2000 for $1.8 billion
- Frank Jao – pioneer behind Little Saigon, Westminster, California, and the Asian Garden Mall
- Eric Ly – co-founder of LinkedIn, a social networking service
- Johnny Dang – notable Vietnamese American jeweler
- Bill Nguyen – founder of onebox.com and lala.com, sold for $850 million and $80 million respectively
- Kieu Hoang – pharmaceutical billionaire, CEO of RAAS, Inc (USA) and Vice Chairman of Shanghai RAAS Blood Products, China
- Thuan Pham – engineer, former CTO of Uber and Coupang
- Henry Nguyen – venture capitalist/investor, brought McDonald's, Pizza Hut, and Forbes to Vietnam
- Tran Dinh Truong – hotel magnate, owned NYC’s infamous Hotel Carter
- Danh Quach – pioneer of Little Saigon, Orange County, real estate investor, businessman, pharmacist
- Chinh Chu – co-chair of Blackstone Private Equity and founder of CC Capital
- Thuy Thanh Truong (1985–2020) – serial entrepreneur, technology influencer, and cancer advocate

== Literature, authors and journalism ==
- Aimee Phan – author of We Should Never Meet
- Andrew X. Pham – author of Catfish and Mandala: A Two-Wheeled Voyage Through the Landscape and Memory of Vietnam (1999)
- Chau Nguyen – news anchor; first Vietnamese-American to be awarded a regional Emmy Award
- Andy Ngo – right-wing author, journalist, social media influencer
- Đỗ Ngọc Yến (1941–2016) – founder of Nguoi Viet Daily News, the oldest and largest Vietnamese daily publication in the US, and a founding father of Little Saigon, Orange County, California
- Đoàn Văn Toại (1945–2017) – author of The Vietnamese Gulag
- Huỳnh Sanh Thông (1926–2008) – author known for An Anthology of Vietnamese Poems: From the Eleventh through the Twentieth Centuries
- Jenna Lê – poet and physician; author of "A History of the Cetacean-American Diaspora"
- Kien Nguyen – author of The Unwanted, a Memoir of Childhood
- Lan Cao – former attorney and current law professor, author of Monkey Bridge
- Le Ly Hayslip – author of When Heaven and Earth Changed Places, which was turned into a motion picture (Heaven & Earth) directed by Oliver Stone
- Le Thi Diem Thuy – award-winning-author of the novel The Gangster We Are All Looking For
- Mong-Lan – college professor and author of Song of the Cicadas
- Monique Truong – author of The Book of Salt
- Andrew Lam – writer and journalist Author of Perfume Dreams: Reflections On The Vietnamese Diaspora
- Nguyễn Chí Thiện (1939–2012) – poet and winner of the international poetry award in 1985
- Nguyen Do – poet, editor and translator; co-author of Black Dog, Black Night Contemporary Vietnamese Poetry (2008) and Beyond the Court Gate: Selected Poems of Nguyen Trai (2010)
- Nguyen Qui Duc – essayist, radio producer, and author of Where the Ashes Are: The Odyssey of a Vietnamese Family
- Lê Xuân Nhuận – author of Vietnamese poems; human rights activist; author of Poems by Selected Vietnamese
- Ocean Vuong – poet and 2016 Whiting Award Winner
- Quang X. Pham – author; founder of Lathian Systems, Chairman and CEO of Cadrenal Therapeutics (Nasdaq: CVKD)
- Stephanie Trong – Jane executive editor
- Trinh T. Minh-ha – author, post-colonial scholar, and filmmaker
- Ut Huynh Cong – photographer; first Vietnamese American to win the Pulitzer Prize for Spot News Photography (1973) and the World Press Award
- Viet Thanh Nguyen – author of The Sympathizer, the 2016 Pulitzer Prize for Fiction. The novel was adapted as a television series of the same name on HBO.
- Vu Tran – author of Dragonfish
- Linh Dinh – poet, writer, translator, and photographer
- Kimberly Nguyễn – poet and author of ghosts in the stalks and a forthcoming collection in fall
- Soleil Ho – San Francisco Chronicle's restaurant critic, writer, podcaster, and chef
- Julie C. Dao – best known for her debut novel Forest of a Thousand Lanterns, an East Asian-inspired retelling of the Evil Queen legend from Snow White, and its sequel Kingdom of the Blazing Phoenix.
- Diana Khoi Nguyen – poet, her debut Ghost Of, was a finalist for the 2018 National Book Award in Poetry. She is currently an assistant professor at the University of Pittsburgh.
- Van Hoang – author best known for her debut novel Girl Giant and the Monkey King
- Hoa Nguyen – poet, academic
- Mong-Lan – writer, poet
- LeUyen Pham – Children's book illustrator and writer of more than 120 books. In 2020 she won a Caldecott Medal for her illustrations in Bear Came Along
- Bao Phi – poet and artist
- Amy Quan Barry – poet, recipient of the Agnes Lynch Starrett Poetry Prize
- Thanhha Lai – writer who won the 2011 National Book Award for Young People's Literature and a Newbery Honor for her debut novel, Inside Out & Back Again
- Lê Xuân Nhuận – poet and writer
- Beth Nguyen – novelist and nonfiction writer who won an American Book Award for novel Short Girls
- Hieu Minh Nguyen – poet
- Thuc Doan Nguyen – writer
- Quan Barry – poet and novelist

== Military ==
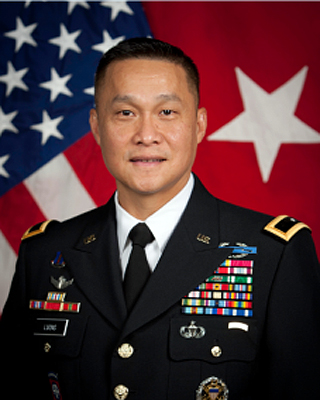
Viet Xuan Luong

- Viet Xuan Luong – Major General, Commander of United States Army, Japan
- Lapthe Flora – Major General, Commander of Combined Joint Task Force – Horn of Africa
- William H. Seely III – Major General, US Marine Corps; Director of Marine Corps Intelligence; American father/Vietnamese mother.
- Quang X. Pham – First Vietnamese American to earn naval aviator's wings in the US Marine Corps; author and CEO
- Huan Nguyen – Engineer, Rear Admiral In the United States Navy
- John R. Edwards – Major General, US Air Force; Director for Strategic Capabilities Policy on the National Security Council
- Tam Minh Pham – First Vietnamese graduate of the United States Military Academy at West Point
- Jean Nguyen – First Vietnamese women to graduate from the United States Military Academy at West Point
- Hung Cao – acting United States secretary of the Navy since April 22, 2026; United States under secretary of the Navy since 2025
- Cao Văn Viên – four-star army general in the Army of the Republic of Vietnam during the Vietnam War
- Ngô Quang Trưởng – Lieutenant General in the Army of the Republic of Vietnam

== Politics and law ==
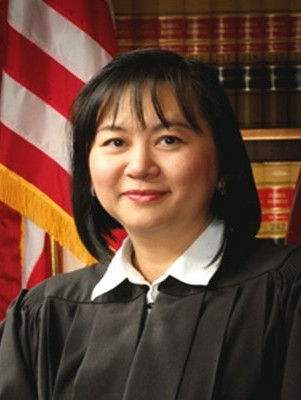
Jacqueline Nguyen

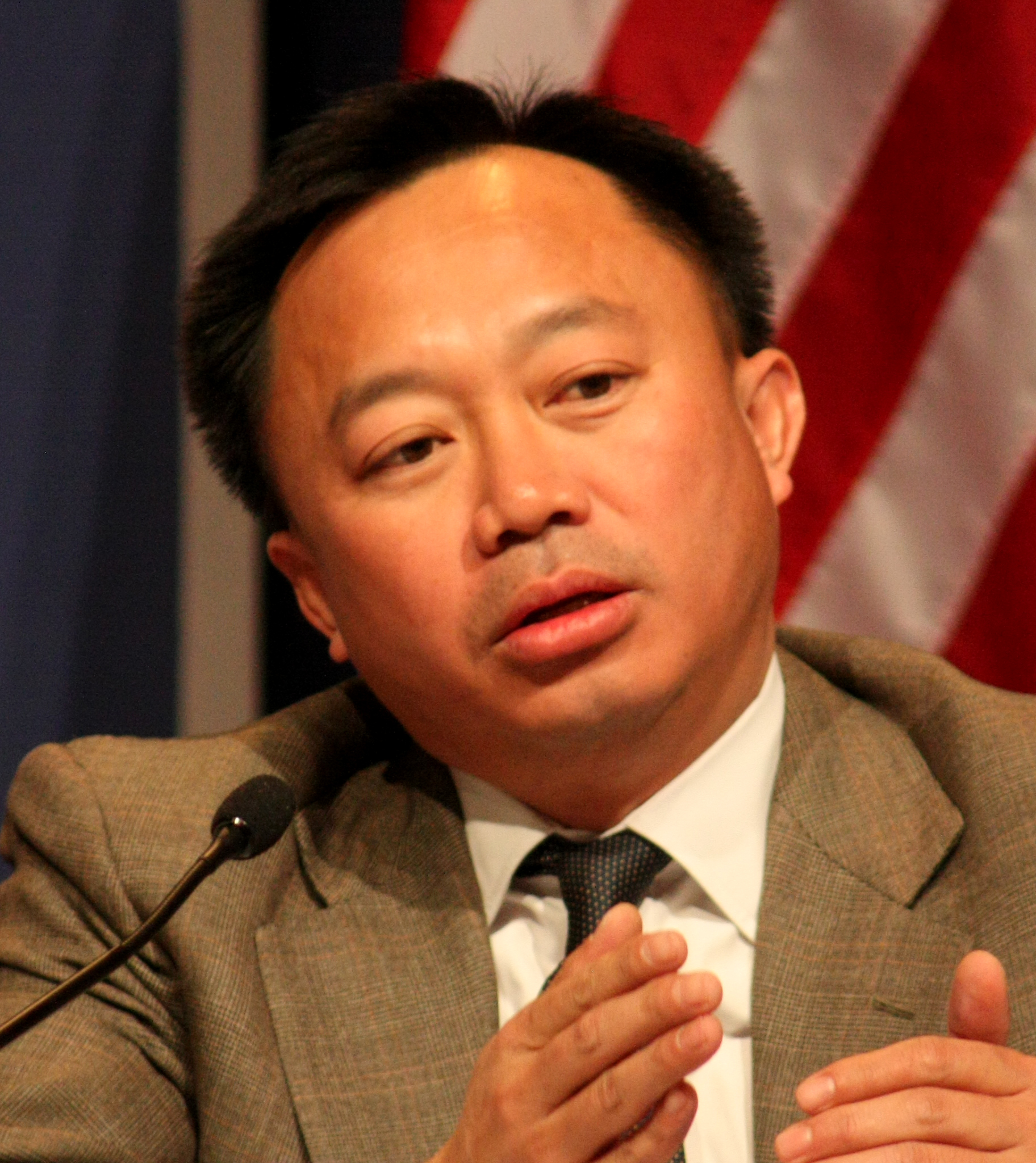
Viet D. Dinh

=== Federal legislators ===
- Joseph Cao – first Vietnamese-American Congressman, represented Louisiana's 2nd congressional district (Republican)
- Viet D. Dinh – former United States Assistant Attorney General; drafted the USA Patriot Act
- John Quoc Duong – President George W. Bush's appointee as executive director of the White House Initiative on Asian Americans and Pacific Islanders (Republican)
- Stephanie Murphy (born Đặng Thị Ngọc Dung) – first Vietnamese-American Congresswoman representing Florida's 7th congressional district(Democratic)
- Jacqueline Nguyen – U.S. circuit judge; first Vietnamese-American federal judge; first Asian-American woman to sit on the federal appellate court
- Mina Nguyen – Deputy Assistant Secretary for Business Affairs and Public Liaison at the US Treasury Department
- J. Peter Pham – United States Special Envoy for the Sahel Region of Africa and the first Vietnamese American with the rank of ambassador
- Dat Tran — Acting United States Secretary of Veterans Affairs
- Tho Bella Dinh-Zarr – Public health scientist, specializing in injury prevention. Dinh-Zarr was the 42nd Member of the National Transportation Safety Board, and served as vice-chairman and acting chairman during her tenure
- Miranda Mai Du – Chief Judge of the United States District Court for the District of Nevada
- Buu Van Nygren – 10th President of the Navajo Nation the largest Indian reservation in the US
- Tony Pham – Acting Director of the U.S. Immigration and Customs Enforcement, Lawyer
- Michelle Giuda – was Under Secretary of State for Public Diplomacy and Public Affairs, and first Assistant Secretary of State for Global Public Affairs, and Assistant Secretary of State for Public Affairs
- Danny Lam Nguyen – lawyer and associate judge of the Superior Court of the District of Columbia since 2024
- An Thanh Le – Served as the Consul General for the United States in Ho Chi Minh City
- Caroline D. Pham – Commissioner of the Commodity Futures Trading Commission
- Derek Tran – Congressman representing California's 45th congressional district (Democrat)

=== State legislators ===
- Jerome Cochran – Tennessee State Representative (Republican), first Vietnamese American elected to the Tennessee legislature
- Tyler Diep – California State Assemblyman (Republican)
- Hoan Huynh – Illinois State Representative (Democratic), first Vietnamese American elected in Illinois state history
- Bee Nguyen – Georgia State Representative (Democratic)
- Duy Nguyen – Nevada State Representative (Democratic)
- Hoang Nguyen – Utah State Representative (Democratic), first Vietnamese-American elected to the Utah State Legislature
- Janet Nguyen – Orange County Supervisor, former California State Senator and State Representative (Republican)
- Joe Nguyen – Washington State Senator (Democratic)
- Quang Nguyen – Arizona State Representative (Republican) and businessman
- Rochelle Nguyen – Nevada State Senator (Democratic)
- Tram Nguyen – Massachusetts State Representative (Democratic)
- Janet Nguyen – California State Senator (Republican)
- Stephanie Nguyen - California State Assemblywoman (Democratic)
- Duy Nguyen – Nevada State Representative (Democratic)
- Daniel Nguyen (politician) – Oregon State Representative (Democratic)
- Hoa Nguyen (politician) – Oregon State Representative (Democratic)
- Hai Pham – Oregon State Representative (Democratic)
- Khanh Pham – Oregon State Representative (Democratic)
- Tri Ta – California State Assemblyman, Mayor of Westminster, California (Republican)
- My-Linh Thai – Washington State Representative (Democratic)
- Thuy Tran – Oregon State Representative (Democratic)
- Dean Tran – first Vietnamese-American elected to the Massachusetts Legislature (Republican)
- Long Tran Georgia State Representative (Democratic)
- Kathy Tran – Virginia State Delegate
- Thuy Tran – Oregon House of Representatives (Democratic)
- Van Tran – First Vietnamese American elected to any state legislature; California State Assemblyman (Republican)
- Hubert Vo – Texas State Representative (Democratic)

=== Local government ===
- John Tran – Mayor of Rosemead, California (Democratic)
- Helen Tran – Mayor of San Bernardino, California (Democratic)
- Tyrin Truong – Mayor of Bogalusa, Louisiana (Democratic)
- Jocelyn Yow – Mayor of Eastvale, California
- Andrew Do – Orange County, California Board of Supervisors (Republican)
- Tony Lam – first Vietnamese-American in any elected office; Westminster, California city council (Republican)
- Madison Nguyen – San Jose City Council member and Vice Mayor of City of San Jose, California (Democratic)
- Al Hoang – member of the Houston City Council and first Vietnamese of the council, criminal defense lawyer
- Thu Nguyen – member of the Worcester, Massachusetts City Council
- Wendy Duong – Associate Municipal Judge for the City of Houston and Magistrate for the State of Texas, first Vietnamese-American to hold judicial office in the United States

=== Political activists and other ===
- Bùi Diễm (1923–2021) – one of the last South Vietnamese ambassadors to the United States during the final phase of the Vietnam War and later resettled in Rockville, Maryland
- Priscilla Chan – pediatrician and philanthropist, co-founder of Chan Zuckerberg Initiative
- Amanda Nguyen – civil rights activist, CEO of Rise, and commercial astronaut; also known for proposing and helping draft the Sexual Assault Survivors' Rights Act, a landmark case for civil rights and victims rights legislation which passed unanimously in Congress and was signed by President Barack Obama in 2016 She was listed in 2022 Time Women of the Year.
- Minh Dang – speaker, advocate on matters of human trafficking and social justice, cofounder of anti-human trafficking organizations, and member of the U.S. Advisory Council to End Human Trafficking
- Kiem Do – former officer of the Republic of Vietnam Navy, known for secretly organizing the successful evacuation of over 30,000 refugees aboard 32 naval ships after the Fall of Saigon; later became a US schoolteacher and cost engineer
- Pham Duc Trung Kien – private equity investor and philanthropist
- Hồ Thành Việt – computer engineer and entrepreneur who is credited with making desktop publishing more accessible to Vietnamese speakers
- Phạm Quang Khiêm – former South Vietnam Air Force pilot, orchestrated the 1975 C-130A escape, commercial aviator at US Airways
- Nguyễn Hữu Chánh – founder and former Prime Minister of the Government of Free Vietnam
- Vince Dao – Vietnamese-American conservative political commentator
- Hoang Tu Duy – democracy activist and current executive director for Việt Tân
- Nguyen Quoc Quan – mathematics researcher and human rights activist

== Science and education ==
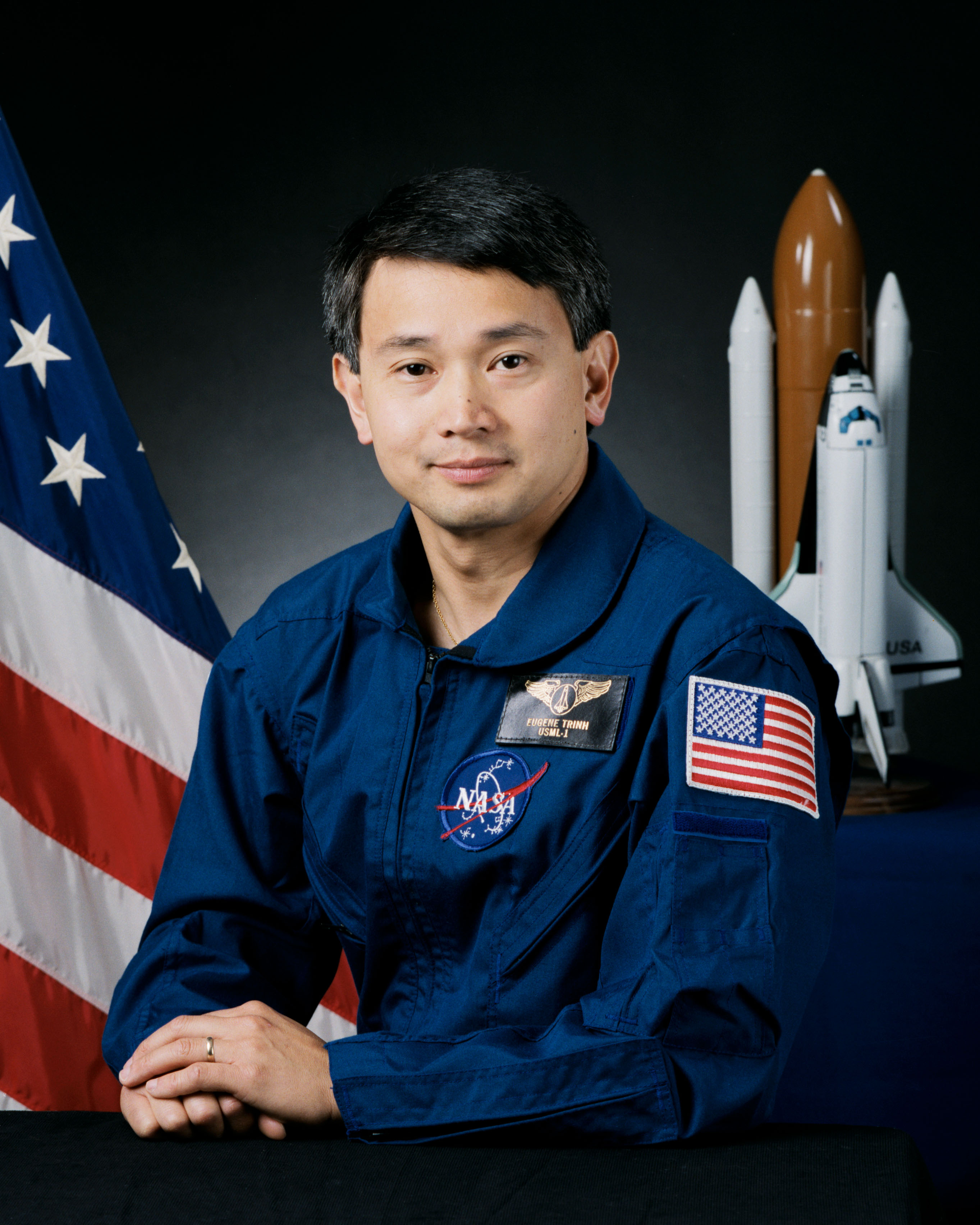
Eugene H. Trinh

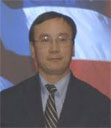
Han Dinh

- Kathy Pham – computer scientist and product leader; founding product and engineering member at the United States Digital Service at the White House, Nguoi Viet 40 under 40.
- Han T. Dinh – Director of Vehicle Engineering, United States Postal Service; winner of 2006 White House "Closing of Circle Award"
- Bui Tuong Phong (1942–1975) – computer graphics pioneer; inventor of Phong reflection model and Phong shading interpolation method
- Duy-Loan Le – Prominent Texas Instruments engineer
- Eugene H. Trinh – NASA astronaut, first Vietnamese-American to travel into outer space
- Hồ Thành Việt (1955–2003) – founder of VNI Software Co., California
- Jane Luu – Astronomer, Co-discoverer of Kuiper Belt and many Asteroids
- Nguyễn Xuân Vinh (1930–2022) – professor of aerospace engineering, University of Michigan; first Vietnamese to receive the Dirk Brouwer Award (2006); author of Pilot's Life
- Duong Anh Nguyet – Responsible for the creation of many Thermobaric weapons, she is noted as the "Scientist who developed the bomb that ended the war with Afghanistan" Director for the Borders and Maritime Security Division within the DHS Science and Technology Directorate. Given National Security Medal in 2007
- Khanh D. Pham – acclaimed aerospace engineer
- Trịnh Xuân Thuận – author of The Birth of the Universe; astrophysicist; professor of astronomy at the University of Virginia
- Tuan Vo-Dinh – inventor, professor and director of the Fitzpatrick Institute for Photonics of Duke University; ranked No. 43 on a list of the world's top 100 living geniuses
- Xuong Nguyen-Huu – biology professor, University of California; pioneer in AIDS research; invented the x-ray multiwire area detector
- Đàm Thanh Sơn – theoretical physicist, university professor at University of Chicago, member of National Academy of Sciences
- Van H. Vu – professor of mathematics at Yale University
- Trần Duy Trác – professor of electrical and computer engineering at Johns Hopkins University
- SonBinh Nguyen – professor of chemistry at Northwestern University; Highly Cited Researcher
- Thuc-Quyen Nguyen – professor of chemistry at University of California, Santa Barbara; Highly Cited Researcher
- Chi Van Dang – professor; scientific director at Ludwig Cancer Research; former director of the Abramson Cancer Center at the University of Pennsylvania Perelman School of Medicine; member of the National Academy of Medicine (Institute of Medicine), American Academy of Arts & Sciences.
- My Hang V. Huynh – chemist in the High Explosives Science and Technology Group at Los Alamos National Laboratory
- Lan Cao – professor of law at Chapman University School of Law, former professor of many prominent US Law Schools, and author notable for books Monkey Bridge and The Lotus and the Storm
- John Pham (scientist) – molecular biologist and editor-in-chief of Cell, a scientific journal publishing research papers across a broad range of disciplines within the life sciences
- Tran T. Kim-Trang – artist, professor of art and media at Scripps College a private liberal arts women's college
- Ngo Vinh Long – professor of history at the University of Maine from 1985 until his death in 2022, author
- Xuong Nguyen-Huu – pioneer of protein crystallography technology. Professor emeritus of physics, biology, chemistry and biochemistry at UC San Diego since 1964; also the inventor of "Xuong’s X-Ray Machine"
- Phạm Hữu Tiệp – mathematician, professor of mathematics at Rutgers University
- Dương Hồng Phong – mathematician, professor of mathematics at Columbia University
- Huỳnh Sanh Thông – scholar and translator
- Quynh-Thu Le – radiation oncologist specializing in head and neck cancer, chair of the department of radiation oncology at the Stanford University School of Medicine
- Darrion Nguyen – science communicator
- Mimi Thi Nguyen – scholar, punk, zine author. professor of gender & women’s studies and Asian American studies at University of Illinois Urbana-Champaign
- Tomas Vu – LeRoy Neiman Professor in Visual Arts at Columbia University
- An-My Lê – professor of photography at Bard College
- Pipo Nguyen-Duy – Professor of Photography at Oberlin College
- Quoc V. Le – computer scientist, pioneer at Google Brain
- Lam M. Nguyen – computer scientist and applied mathematician, Research Scientist at the IBM Research

== Sports, athletes, games ==
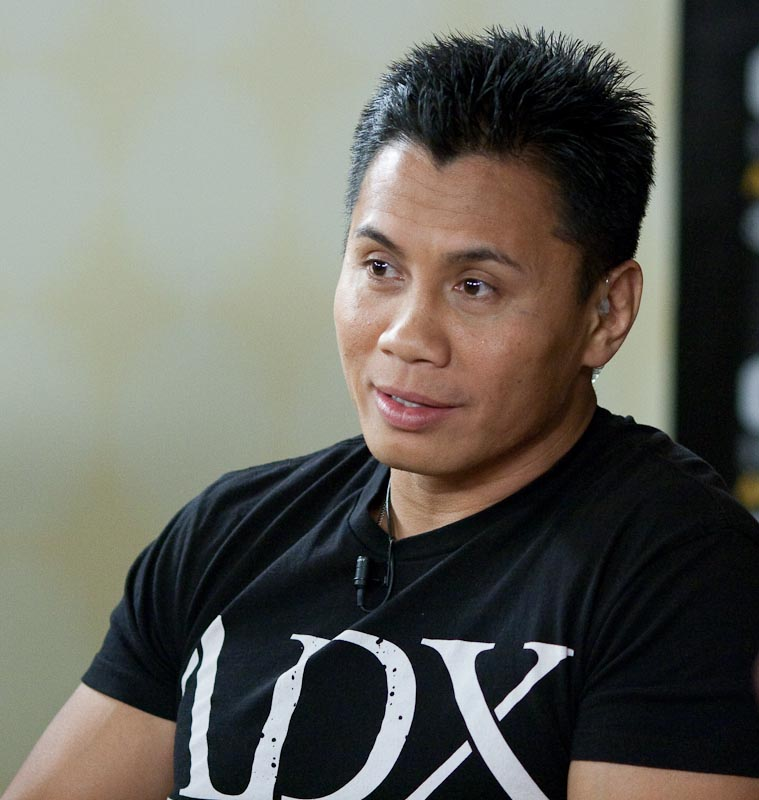
Cung Le

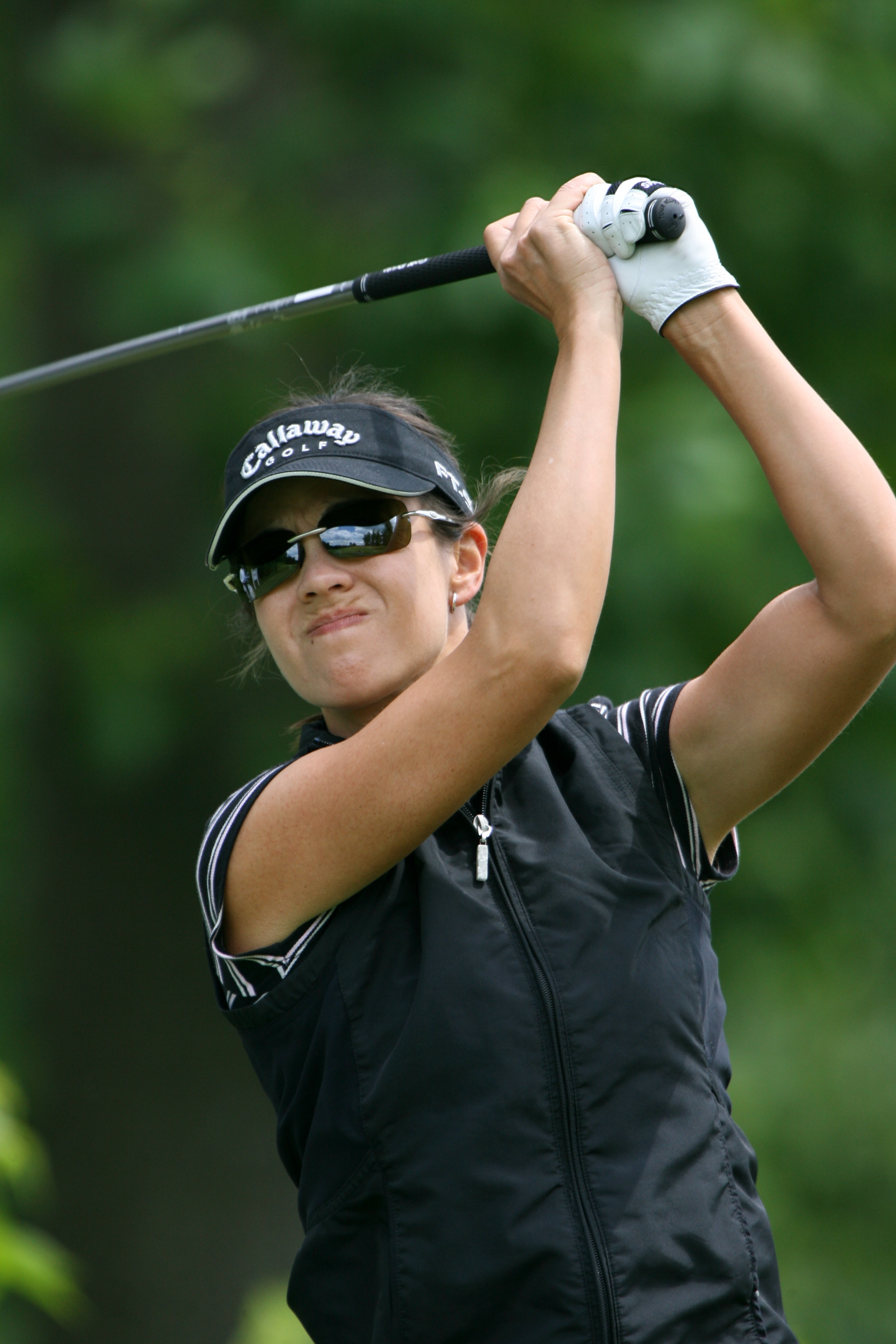
Leta Lindley

=== Baseball ===
- Danny Graves – MLB baseball player
- Jim Parque – the only left-handed pitcher on the Olympic baseball team that won a bronze medal in Atlanta in 1996
- Tommy Pham – MLB baseball player

=== Basketball ===
- Mark Tatum – Sports and business executive who is currently serving as the Deputy Commissioner of the NBA under Adam Silver, also currently holds the position of the NBA's chief operating officer
- Jaylin Williams – first player of Vietnamese descent to be drafted in the NBA, professional basketball player
- Johnny Juzang – NBA player
- Kaylynne Truong – first woman of Vietnamese descent to be selected in the WNBA, professional basketball player
- David Arnold – professional basketball player
- Tam Dinh – professional basketball player
- Dương Vĩnh Luân – professional basketball player
- Khoa Tran – professional basketball player
- Larry Tieu – professional basketball player

=== Soccer ===
- Zara Chavoshi – soccer player of Vietnamese descent
- Lee Nguyen – Major League Soccer player and coach
- Viet Nguyen – soccer player, spent his entire career with the Seattle Sounders
- Jaedyn Shaw - player with United States women's national soccer team and San Diego Wave FC; Vietnamese on maternal side
- Minh Vu – soccer player
- Katie Duong – soccer player, she has played for the United States women's national under-20 soccer team
- Cyrus Tran – professional soccer player, who plays as a midfielder for Becamex Binh Duong
- Thien Nguyen – played professionally in Western Soccer Alliance and MISL I
- Kennedy Linh Fuller – professional soccer player, midfielder for Angel City FC, named the national 2023 Gatorade Player of the Year. Won bronze for the US at the 2024 FIFA U-17 Women's World Cup

=== Fighting sports ===
- Cung Le – kickboxer and MMA fighter; undefeated San Shou champion; former Strikeforce champion, UFC fighter, actor and coach
- Thanh Le – former ONE Featherweight World Champion
- Dat Nguyen (boxer) – World Ranked Professional boxer
- Nam Phan – MMA fighter in the UFC
- Ben Nguyen – MMA fighter, UFC Fighter
- Bao Quach – featherweight, professional mixed martial artist
- Ngô Đồng – grandmaster of the International school of Cuong Nhu Oriental Martial Arts, entomologist, professor in the Department of Entomology and Nematology at the University of Florida

=== Poker ===
- Men Nguyen – professional poker player; as of 2010, his total live tournament winnings exceeded $9,700,000
- Qui Nguyen (poker player) – 2016 World Series of Poker Main Event Champion
- Scotty Nguyen – professional poker player
- David Pham – professional poker, won two World Series of Poker bracelets and has made seven final tables at the World Poker Tour
- J.C. Tran – professional poker player; as of 2010, his total live tournament winnings amounted to $7,996,635
- Mimi Tran – professional poker player; as of 2008, her total live tournament winnings exceeded $1,400,000
- Nam Le – professional poker player as of August 2014, his total live tournament winnings exceed $6,800,000. His 24 cashes at the WSOP account for $854,337 of those winnings.
- John Phan – two-time World Series of Poker bracelet winner and is a winner and four-time final tablist of World Poker Tour Championships.
- Kenny Tran – professional poker player
- Quinn Do – professional poker player
- Chau Giang – three-time World Series of Poker bracelet winner and a three-time final tablist of the World Poker Tour
- Minh Nguyen – professional poker player, is a two-time World Series of Poker bracelet winner
- Vinny Vinh – professional poker player
- Can Kim Hua – professional poker player who is a three-time final tablist at both the World Series of Poker (WSOP) and on the World Poker Tour
- Theo Tran – professional poker player

=== Golf ===
- Lilia Vu - professional golfer and LPGA Tour player. In 2023, she rose to number one in the Women's World Golf Rankings and became LPGA Tour Player of the Year after winning four titles, including two majors at the 2023 Chevron Championship and 2023 Women's British Open.
- Leta Lindley – LPGA Tour golfer

=== Tennis ===
- Brandon Nakashima – ATP Tour tennis player of Japanese and Vietnamese descent
- Thai-Son Kwiatkowski – men's professional tennis player
- Daniel Nguyen – first Vietnamese American to play in the US Open Tennis tournament
- Learner Tien – professional tennis player
- Michelle Do – table tennis player, Youngest ever member at 17 of the U.S. Women's Table Tennis Team for the 2000 Summer Olympics
- Bryce Nakashima – ATP Tour tennis player of Japanese and Vietnamese descent

=== Esports ===
- Ken Hoang – American professional Super Smash Bros. Melee player, Survivor contestant
- NuckleDu – professional fighting game player particularly Street Fighter
- Andy Dinh – professional League of Legends player, Owner of Team SoloMid (TSM), an esports organization
- Balls (gamer) – professional League of Legends player
- Hai (gamer) – professional League of Legends player

=== Chess ===
- Paul Truong – professional chess player, holds the USCF title of National Master and FIDE Master, and is married to Women's World Chess Champion Susan Polgar
- Emily Nguyen – professional chess player, Woman International Master

=== Skating ===
- Avonley Nguyen – ice dancer, 2020 World Junior champion, national 2020 US Junior champion, 2019–20 Grand Prix of Figure Skating Final silver medalist, won 3 gold medals at ISU Junior Grand Prix qualifying for 2018–19 Grand Prix of Figure Skating Final
- Max Settlage – pair skater, 2014 U.S. national junior champion
- Don Nguyen – pro skateboarder, recognized as the first person to ollie down the legendary "El Toro" 20 stair-set, one of the most infamous skate spots in the sport, considered a proving ground for athletes of skateboarding
- Aaron Tran – short track speed skater, competed in the 2018 Winter Olympics

=== Football ===
- Dat Nguyen – NFL football player who was a linebacker for seven seasons with the Dallas Cowboys and is the first Vietnamese-American to be drafted, play, and be recognized as an All-Pro in the NFL. In 2017, he was elected to the College Football Hall of Fame
- Noel Prefontaine – professional Canadian football punter and placekicker in the CFL

=== Badminton ===
- Howard Bach – badminton player, the 2005 World Champion
- Nguyễn Quang Minh – badminton player

=== Swimming ===
- Haven Shepherd – swimmer
- Jacklyn Luu – Synchronized swimmer, competed at the 2024 Summer Olympics winning a silver medal in the team event, first for the US since 2004
- Catherine Mai Lan Fox – Olympic swimmer

=== Other sports ===
- Minh Thai – World’s First Rubik's Cube Champion in 1982
- Amy Tran – field hockey player
- Joe Walters – professional lacrosse player
- Alain Nu – mentalist, illusionist
- Kim Maher – softball player, coach
- Yen Hoang – wheelchair racer
- Cole McDonald – freestyle skier
- Kim Pawelek Brantly – marathon runner
- Nhi Lan Le – fencer, competed in the women's individual and team épée events at the 1996 Summer Olympics

== Religion ==
- Thích Thiên-Ân (1925–1980) – Buddhist monk
- Luong Kim Dinh (1914–1997) – Catholic priest, scholar, and philosopher
- Nguyễn Thị Thuấn (1916–2015) – Christian missionary and Women's General Commissioner of the Protestant Church of Vietnam
- Dominic Mai Thanh Lương (1940–2017) – Catholic auxiliary bishop of the Diocese of Orange in California and the first Vietnamese American bishop
- Thomas Nguyễn Thái Thành – Catholic auxiliary bishop of the Diocese of Orange in California
- Peter C. Phan – Catholic theologian
- John Trần Văn Nhàn – Catholic auxiliary bishop of the Archdiocese of Atlanta, Georgia
- Michael Phạm Minh Cường – Catholic bishop of the Diocese of San Diego, California and the first Vietnamese American bishop to head a diocese
- Jonathan Tran – Christian theologian and scholar
- Peter Bùi Đại - Catholic auxiliary bishop of the Diocese of Phoenix, Arizona
