= Thuy Thanh Truong =

Vietnamese entrepreneur (1985–2020)

- Born: Truong Thanh Thuy; December 16, 1985; Ho Chi Minh City, Vietnam
- Died: January 25, 2020 (aged 34)
- Education: University of Southern California (BS)
- Website: thuytruong.saltfightcancer.org/en

Thuy Thanh Truong known as Thuy Muoi (December 16, 1985 – January 25, 2020) was a Vietnamese American serial entrepreneur, technology influencer, and cancer advocate. She was known as "Vietnam's startup queen" for her contributions to the Vietnamese startup community

== Early life and education ==
Thuy was born and grew up as an only child in Bien Hoa, a city in South Vietnam. In 2003, her family moved to the US for her education. She attended Alhambra High School for her senior year of high school. Thuy started her college education at Pasadena City College. She transferred to the University of Southern California and graduated in 2009 with a Bachelor of Science in Computer Science.

== Career ==
=== Food and Beverage, 2009 – 2012 ===
In late 2008, Thuy and her friend, Ha Pham, started working on their first business in Vietnam, while both of them were still students. In June 2009, they opened the flagship store of Parallel Frozen Yogurt.

She raised funding from a group of angel investors and opened 3 more stores in prime locations in Ho Chi Minh City, such as Vincom, NowZone, and CoopMart before winding down the business in 2012.

=== Mobile Startups, 2011 – 2015 ===
In 2010, her USC classmate, Elliot Lee, visited Vietnam. The two decided to start an app development studio in Ho Chi Minh City to tap into Vietnamese software engineering resources. The studio, GreenGar, is known for its popular collaborative whiteboard drawing app, which was #1 in the Productivity Category on the iOS App Store in the U.S. and other countries.

In 2011, Thuy organized a Mobile Hackathon in Vietnam at the University of Science – Vietnam National University in Thu Duc, Ho Chi Minh City. The event was sponsored by GreenGar Studios and hosted by the Advanced Program of Computer Science.

In 2013, Thuy was selected as a finalist of the Women 2.0 PITCH Competition in the San Francisco. She made her first public appearance in Silicon Valley in a Vietnamese traditional white dress and was recognized as Runner-Up. GreenGar was accepted to 500 Startups (Batch 6) in June 2013, changed its name to GreenGar Inc., and focused on Whiteboard. GreenGar was as the first Vietnam-based company to join the accelerator program.

In 2014, GreenGar shut down – having failed to scale up the business. The team spin off to create Tappy – adding Leslie Nguyen and Thuc Vu to the founding team.

Tappy made several launch attempts, including at the Future Now Music Festival, and Fuse #8withme Party. In May 2015, Tappy announced their acquihire by Weeby.co – a game technology company in Mountain View, CA. Thuy worked as Weeby's Director for Business Development for Asia after the acquisition.

In December 2015, Thuy appeared in Vietnamese press and media one more time with the Vietnam Hour of Code. The event was co-organized by Weeby.co and Viettel Group – the biggest Vietnamese telecommunication conglomerate. In 2016, Thuy left Weeby.co.

=== Movie ===
Thuy is the subject lead in the documentary movie “She Started It” – directed by Nora Poggi and Insiyah Saeed. The documentary also featured Sheena Allen Stacey Ferreira Brienne Ghafourifar and Agathe Molinar amongst others and was released at the Mill Valley Film Festival in October 2016.

=== Publications ===
Thuy's blog posts were featured on Women 2.0, TechinAsia, and e27. She wrote mostly about her entrepreneurial journey and Vietnam startups.

In March 2016, she published her first book, together with Viet Youth Entrepreneur, and earned an endorsement from the official Party Secretary of the Ho Chi Minh City People's Committee – Dinh La Thang – as an inspiration for youth in startups.

== Awards and recognition ==
Thuy spoke at multiple conferences and tech events worldwide to encourage young entrepreneurs. She shared insights from the Vietnamese tech ecosystem, and women in innovation, including Women 2.0, World Bank infoDev, and Echelon.

- She was on the cover of Forbes Vietnam 30 Under 30 (2015)
- BBC News: Vietnam's start-up queen
- TechinAsia recognized her as one of the “10 promising Southeast Asia tech entrepreneurs under 30”
- World Bank infoDev: Winner of Dragon Den Pitch Competition

== Cancer ==
On October 14, 2016, Thuy announced on Medium about her late stage lung cancer diagnosis. She died on January 25, 2020.

== Related links ==
- “Vietnam’s startup queen”
- “10 promising Southeast Asian tech entrepreneurs under 30”
- Whiteboard
- Tappy exits to US-based Weeby.co
- Greengar CEO Opens Up About Networking Across Cultures
- Greengar, Co-Founded by CEO Thuy Truong, Joins 500 Startups in Mountain View
- Women Innovation Panel in South Africa
- 5 insights for investors
