= Mong-Lan =

American poet

Mộng-Lan
- Born: Saigon, South Vietnam
- Occupations: writer; visual artist; musician; dancer; educator
- Website: monglan.com

== Career ==
Mộng-Lan has published numerous books of poetry: Song of the Cicadas (2001), Why is the Edge Always Windy (2005), Tango, Tangoing (2008), Force of the Heart (2011), One Thousand Minds Brimming (2014), and Dusk Aflame (2017). She has also published three chapbooks: Love Poem to Tofu & Other Poems (2007), Love Poem to Ginger & Other Poems (2012), and Tone of Water in a Half-Filled Glass (2018). Her work has also been anthologized in numerous collections, including The Best American Poetry and The Pushcart Prize Anthology, among others. American poet Robert Creeley called Mộng-Lan "a remarkably accomplished poet", noting that "her poems are deft, extremely graceful in the way words move, and in the cadence that carries them. One is moved by the articulate character of 'things seen,' the subtle shifting of images, and the quiet intensity of their information. Clearly she is a master of the art."

In addition to writing poetry, Mộng-Lan is a musician, singer, and composer. She has released 10 albums, which include works of jazz piano, spoken word poetry, and singing and playing tangos on guitar. She has performed at universities, cultural organizations, clubs and cabarets.

Mộng-Lan has taught at the University of Arizona, Stanford University, the Dallas Museum of Art, the San Diego State University Writers' Conference, in the Asian Division of the University of Maryland University College in Tokyo, and the Jung Center of Houston.

== Awards and honors ==
Mộng-Lan received a Dean's Master of Fine Arts Fellowship from the University of Arizona (1999-2000), a Dr. Muriel Pollia Summer Fellowship in Poetry (2001) and a Stegner Fellowship from Stanford University (2000-2002), and completed a Fulbright Fellowship in Vietnam (2002). She was also the inaugural Visual Artist and Poet in Residence at the Dallas Museum of Art, which she received through a National Endowment for the Arts Grant, as well as a Le Chateau de Lavigny International Writer in Residence in Lavigny, Switzerland (summer 2000). Her poetry has been included in The Best American Poetry 2003 and Pushcart Book of Poetry: Best Poems from 30 Years of the Pushcart Prize (2006).

Awards for Mộng-Lan's work
Work	Award	Result	Ref.
	Billy Waller Prize in Poetry	Winner	
Song of the Cicadas	Juniper Prize for Poetry	Winner	
Song of the Cicadas	Great Lakes Colleges Association's New Writers Awards for Poetry	Winner	
Song of the Cicadas	Norma Farber First Book Award	Finalist	

== Publications ==
=== Anthology contributions ===
- Kim, Elaine H.; Villanueva, Lilia V.; Asian Women United of California, eds. (1995). "Silence of Form". Making More Waves: New Writing by Asian American Women. Beacon Press. pp. 278–282.
- Creeley, Robert, ed. (2002). "Trail". Best of Best American Poetry 2002. New York, NY: Scribner Poetry. ISBN 978-0-7432-0385-2.
- Chang, Victoria, ed. (2004). "Mộng-Lan". Asian American Poetry: The Next Generation. University of Illinois Press. pp. 100–105. ISBN 978-0-252-07174-4.
- Wright, Hillel, ed. (2007). Jungle Crows: A Tokyo Expatriate Anthology. Printed Matter Press. ISBN 978-1-933-60612-5.
- Murray, Joan, ed. (2007). The Pushcart Book of Poetry: The Best Poems from Thirty Years of The Pushcart Prize. Pushcart Press.
- Handal, Nathalie; Shankar, Ravi; Chang, Tina, eds. (2008). Language for a New Century: Contemporary Poetry from the Middle East, Asia, and Beyond. W. W. Norton. ISBN 978-0-393-33238-4.
- Do, Nguyen; Hoover, Paul, eds. (2011). "Mộng-Lan". Black Dog, Black Night: Contemporary Vietnamese Poetry. Milkweed Editions. pp. 203–218. ISBN 978-1-571-31867-1.

=== Books ===
- Song of the Cicadas. University of Massachusetts Press. 2001. ISBN 978-1-558-49307-0.
- Why is the Edge Always Windy?. Tupelo Press. 2005. ISBN 978-1-932-19528-6.
- Tango, Tangoing: Poems & Art. Valiant Press. 2008. ISBN 978-0-615-18800-3.
  - Tango, Tangueando: Poemas & Dibujos. Valiant Press. 2009. ISBN 978-0-578-03361-7.
- Force of the Heart: Tango, Art. Valiant Press. 2011. ISBN 978-0-982-82270-8.
- One Thousand Minds Brimming: Poems and Art. Valiant Press. 2014. ISBN 978-0-982-82272-2.
- Dusk Aflame: Poems & Art. Valiant Press. 2017. ISBN 978-0-982-82274-6.

=== Chapbooks ===
- Love Poem to Tofu & Other Poems. Valiant Press. 2007. ISBN 978-0-615-14656-0.
- Love Poem to Ginger & Other Poems: Poetry & Paintings. Valiant Press. 2012. ISBN 978-0-982-82271-5.
- Tone of Water in a Half-Filled Glass. Foothills Publishing. 2018. ISBN 978-0-921-05318-7.

== Art exhibitions ==
Mộng-Lan has had shows of her artwork and tango drawings and paintings in numerous public exhibitions in the U.S.
