= Jean Nguyen =

Vietnamese-American soldier

- Born: Vung Tau, Vietnam
- Allegiance: United States
- Branch: Army
- Service years: 1985–1989
- Rank: Captain
- Alma mater: United States Military Academy, West Point

Jean Nguyen is a Vietnamese-American. She was a graduate of the United States Military Academy the first woman of Vietnamese descent to do so and among the largest number of women, 107, to graduate to date with the class of 1985. She arrived in the United States following the fall of Saigon not knowing a word of English. She learned English, finishing in the top of her high school class and went on to West Point. Nguyen received her commission as a Second Lieutenant in the U.S. Army at graduation on May 22, 1985 where she went on to ordnance school at the Aberdeen Proving Ground

Nguyen was the guest of President Reagan at the 1985 State of the Union Address where he recognized her as "embodying the values and opportunities of the United States" and calling her an "American Hero."

After leaving the military in December 1989 with the rank of Captain (United States), she joined the Science Applications International Corporation working there for 17 years leaving as a Principal Systems Engineer in 2007. She joined the Central Intelligence Agency (CIA) that same year working there for 11 years.

== See also ==
- Tam Minh Pham a former Vietnamese soldier who immigrate to the United States and was the first of Vietnamese descent to graduate from the US Military Academy.
