= Trung Dung =

American businessman and programmer

- Born: 1967 (age 58–59); South Vietnam
- Education: University of Massachusetts Boston (B.S. in Mathematics & Computer Science)
- Occupations: Entrepreneur; Philanthropist; Programmer; Former engineer at Open Market
- Title: Board member, Vietnam Education Foundation

Trung Dung (born 1967) is an American entrepreneur and technology billionaire known for pioneering an e-business technology and for his life story that began in wartime Vietnam. He has been profiled in Forbes, Financial Times, The Wall Street Journal, San Francisco Chronicle and other publications, as well as in Dan Rather’s The American Dream: Stories from the Heart of Our Nation, Howard Thomas and Havovi Joshi’s Asia's Social Entrepreneurs: Do Well, Do Good...Do Sustainably, and Dave Nelson’s The Incredible Payback: Innovative Sourcing Solutions That Deliver Extraordinary Results. He has been recognized with numerous awards honoring his place as a Vietnamese-born businessman and philanthropist and his business successes.

== Early life and education ==
Dung was born in South Vietnam. After the Fall of Saigon in 1975, his father, a former politician and an officer in the Army of the Republic of Vietnam, was sent to a re-education camp run by the Communist Party of Vietnam. All of the family property was confiscated, and Dung, his mother, grandmother, and two sisters were forced to find new ways to survive. His mother entered the underground economy, buying items and reselling them at a profit. Dung followed her example, catching and selling fish at night and running fruit stands as early as fifth grade.

In his teens, Dung knew he wanted a university education, something that would not be possible in his home country. His family began saving to help him escape Vietnam. It took several attempts, including being shot at and spending a month in jail, but with his mother’s help and connections, Dung finally left Vietnam by boat in 1984. After about a year in an Indonesian refugee camp, he and his older sister (who had also arrived at the camp via boat) left for the United States. Although his intended destination was Louisiana, he instead landed in Boston.

When Dung arrived in Boston, he knew some English but was told he would need several years of schooling to earn a high school diploma. Given his age and ambitions, he took the GED test, which he passed by a slim margin based on his math and science abilities. He enrolled at the University of Massachusetts Boston, where he studied mathematics and computer science while also working as a janitor and dishwasher. He graduated at the top of his class after three years in 1988.

Dung was then offered a spot in the PhD program at Boston University. When his family immigrated to the US in 1990 (his father having been released from prison), he left the program before completing his thesis to take a job to help support them.

== Career ==
In the early 1990s, Dung began working as an engineer at Open Market, a developer of Internet commerce software. While pursuing a personal project at night, he identified a need for software that could index the extensive information returned by web crawlers into something usable for e-commerce.

In 1995, along with Mark Pine, the executive director of a division of Sybase, he founded OnDisplay Corporation to develop and market this software. The pair raised $35 million in venture capital and soon had more than 80 clients, including Travelocity. In 1999, OnDisplay had one of the ten most successful IPOs of the year; it was sold to Vignette Corporation in 2000 for $1.8 billion.

In 2001, Dung founded and served as CEO of Fogbreak Solutions, which created business applications aimed at optimizing supply chain operations and finance. The company raised $25 million in venture capital funding, but investors eventually withdrew support.

In 2006, Dung was appointed by President George W. Bush to the Vietnam Education Foundation's Board of Directors.

In 2008, Dung founded the Singapore-based iCare Benefits, pioneering a buy now, pay later (BNPL) model for factory workers across Southeast Asia.

=== Awards ===
- 2005 – American Heritage Award, American Immigration Law Organization
- 2004 – Golden Torch, Vietnamese American Association
- Forty Under Forty Award, East Bay Business, California

== Philanthropy ==
Dung has founded, advised, or served on the board of the following nonprofits:

- 1988–1992: VietNet Forum – Founder; an electronic forum for Vietnamese living overseas that grew to about 1,000 members worldwide.
- 2002: Vietnamese American Silicon Valley Networks – Advisor; a global bridge among Vietnamese professionals in the high-tech industry.
- 2005: Viet Heritage Society – Board of Directors; mission was to preserve and promote Vietnamese culture and history through cultural venues and educational programming.
- 2005: Interplast – Board of Directors; provides reconstructive plastic surgery to children in need.
