= Thuc Doan Nguyen =

American screenwriter

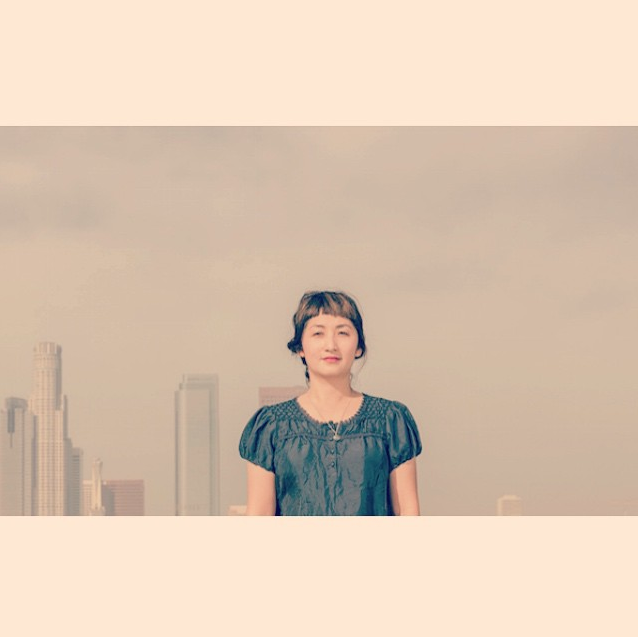
- Nguyen in Downtown Los Angeles 2015
- Born: 1975 or 1976 (age 50–51); Vietnam
- Citizenship: Dual EU and US
- Education: University of North Carolina at Chapel Hill
- Occupations: Filmmaker, Screenwriter, Film Producer
- Years active: 2003 – present
- Known for: Essay writing
- Website: consideratecontent.com

Thuc Doan Nguyen (Thục Đoan Nguyễn) is a writer and producer. She founded "The Bitch Pack", a group dedicated to promoting female-driven screenplays through Twitter and other social media sites. Nguyen is the winner of a 2020 Sundance Institute Inclusion Initiative Fellowship which enabled her to attend the Sundance Film Festival that year, the same year her screenplay "Scent of the Delta" was in Round 2 of the Development Labs (semi-finalist). She is also the founder of the original "#StartWith8Hollywood" which expands opportunities for women creators of color. Nguyen is also the founder of the online portal Spooky Spaces. She is the captain of the first ever Vietnamese American Mardi Gras Krewe since the carnival began. She appears on the original Ringer/Spotify 2023 series "The Big Picture" regarding "Vietnam Vogue" along with Oliver Stone and Brian De Palma. Nguyen is the Associate Producer for ELLA, a short film that is a 2026 NAACP Image Award winner, directed by Nikki Taylor Roberts and Executive Produced by Cate Blanchett and Coco Francini.

== Early life ==
Nguyen was born in Vietnam. As a child, she was among the boat people who sought refuge after the Vietnam War. She grew up in North Carolina and Southern Maryland. She is a double major from The University of North Carolina at Chapel Hill in Public Policy Analysis (Environmental Policy) and Communication Studies and also holds a master's degree (MPA) obtained in Southern California. She filmed footage of 9/11 from her apartment.

== Career ==
For Nguyen's work in entertainment, she and her Bitch Pack have been featured in The Huffington Post, Salon, Forbes, Indiewire, The Hollywood Reporter and other outlets, along with the Sundance Film Festival 2021. Nguyen is in the book Rise: A Pop History of Asian America from the Nineties to Now, from Harper Collins, March 2022. She is part of the team of the Rory Kennedy Academy Award-nominated documentary Last Days in Vietnam, being a translator for the film.

Nguyen has written award winning screenplays. Her historical drama screenplay about Lucy Parsons and Albert Parsons & The Haymarket Affair is number one in IndieWire's "Not All Stories Are About Straight White Men". Her feature about Vietnamese-American women in New Orleans has garnered attention, making it to the second round of Sundance Institute Labs.

Nguyen helped launch the first "Cause Related Marketing Department" at Saatchi & Saatchi London for Marjorie Ellis Thompson and Hamish Pringle, aiding them with the book Brand Spirit.

Nguyen has published academically. She presented at the University of London with her paper "Of Cougars and Kittens in Vampire Visual Rhetoric of the Last 30 Years: Ageism, Sexuality, Conformity and Ethics in Relation to Contemporary Fictional Female Vampires in Film & Television". Paper Proposal Accepted by The London Consortium, by Dr. Simon Bacon. She wrote a piece for the book Race/Gender/Class/Media.

In New York City, Nguyen has worked with Kevin McLeod on a series of interactive projects and online games for Atomic Pictures as an associate producer for the web game "The Beast". Nguyen is the voice of Cybertronics and Eliza in Eliza's Tea Room. They made web sites for groups such as the Service Employees International Union. She also worked for other integrated entertainment companies.

Nguyen produced the documentary Goth Parking Lot at The Cure's Jones Beach Dream Tour show, as encouraged by the makers of Heavy Metal Parking Lot, Jeff Krulik and John Heyn, fellow Marylanders.

In Los Angeles, Nguyen worked for Jerry Bruckheimer and Warner Brothers Television as a writers' and executive producers' assistant. Nguyen made up dialogue as Fredrik Bond's "Milkmaid": Creative Annual UK – Best Campaign – Bronze for MJZ.

Nguyen continues her work in film. The Sundance Film Institute, along with The MacArthur Foundation and George Soros' Open Society Foundation, among others, sent Nguyen to The Sundance Film Festival in 2020 for their Inclusion Initiative. She is nominated for the Lynn Shelton memorial grant. She is also an "Emerging Filmmaker" for the Toronto International Film Festival 2020. Nguyen is a grantee of the Center for Cultural Innovation's California Fund for Artists and Cultural Practitioners Award, 2020, The Critical Minded Writers Grant and The Vancouver Asian Film Festival, 2019.

Nguyen's work can be found in various publications. The Los Angeles Times published an essay by Nguyen about modern love. Nguyen's magazine writing work has included: Sweet Action, Useless, Working Class (all New York City indie magazines), Urb and BPM (international music magazines) about popular culture, filmmakers, internet dating, Ima Robot, and Moving Units. Nguyen's also written for Nylon's Beauty Diary about Sting's yoga guru, Ganga White. Nguyen wrote about The Cartier Women's Initiative Awards to which she was invited and Lupita Nyong'o's stance on inclusion for The Hollywood Reporter. Nguyen wrote a deep dive about the words "me love you long time" and racial issues that went viral for Esquire Magazine. She also penned an essay about the history of #BlackPowerYellowPeril. Nguyen is currently an essayist/contributor to The Daily Beast and other major outlets like Vogue Magazine.

Thanks to women such as Amanda de Cadenet and Sam Taylor-Johnson, Nguyen's photography work has been featured in their Girl Gaze Project. Multiple pieces of Nguyen's photography work were featured in Clawmarks Issue One which debuted at London Comic Con in 2016.

Nguyen is active in political satire as an organizer for The Satanic Temple and as part of the writing team for Tomi Lahren viral parody show Toni Lahren produced in Los Angeles. She continues to write about social justice in the form of screenplays.

Nguyen contributed additional literary material to the Paramount Pictures March 2022 feature film release The Lost City starring Sandra Bullock, Channing Tatum and Brad Pitt. She is a 2022 Academy Gold Fellowship Nominee.
