= An Le =

American diplomat

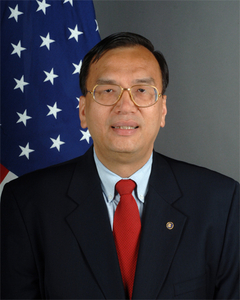
- US Consul General An Le

United States Consul General to Ho Chi Minh City
- In office 6 August 2010 – July 2013
- Preceded by: Kenneth Fairfax
- Succeeded by: Rena Bitter

Personal details
- Born: 1954 (age 71–72) Gò Công, Tiền Giang province, South Vietnam
- Education: George Washington University
- Profession: Engineer

An Thanh Le, (Vietnamese: Lê Thành Ân), born 1954, was previously the Consul General for the US in Ho Chi Minh City, Vietnam, followed by Rena Bitter.

Le was born in Vietnam and was adopted by an American diplomat in France. He moved with his adopted family back to the United States and settled in Virginia. Le and his family are Buddhists.

He holds a master in science in electrical engineering and a master of science in engineering Administration from George Washington University.

After graduating he worked at the United States Department of the Navy before becoming a diplomat in 1991.

== Diplomatic career ==
An Le began his diplomatic career at the Embassy in China (Beijing 1991 to 1994) and moved to other postings in Asia:

- Japan (Tokyo 1994 to 1997)
- Malaysia (Kuala Lumpur 1997 to 2001)
- Singapore (2001 to 2004)
- South Korea (Seoul 2004 to 2007).

He served as the Minister Counselor for Management in the U.S. Embassy in Paris, France from 2007 to 2010.
