= Khanh D. Pham =

Vietnamese American aerospace engineer

Khanh Dai Pham
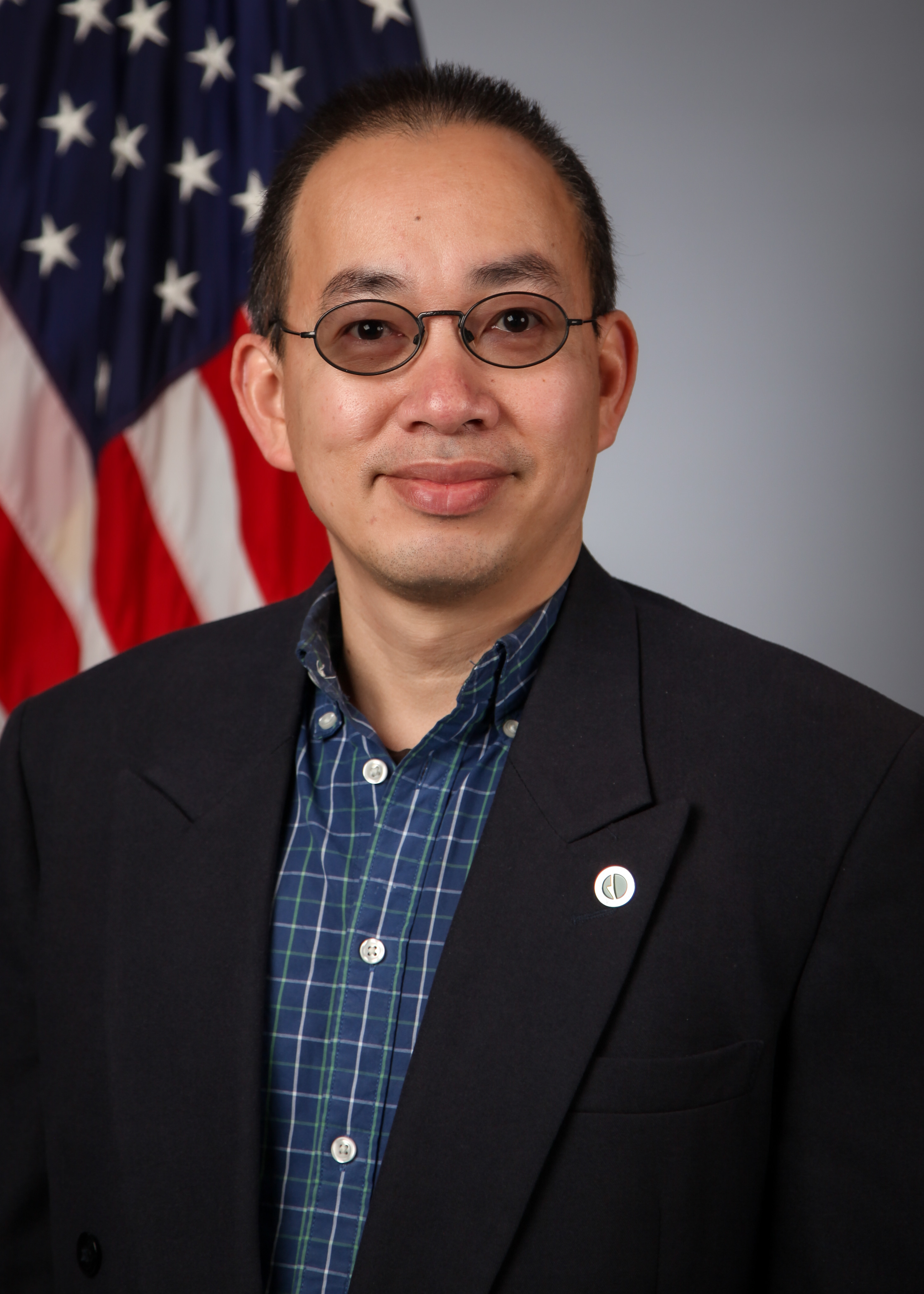
- Born: Ho Chi Minh City, Vietnam
- Education: BSEE, magna cum laude, University of Nebraska–Lincoln (1997); MSEE, University of Nebraska–Lincoln (1998); PhD, University of Notre Dame (2004)
- Occupation: Aerospace engineer
- Known for: Optimal statistical control theory; game-theoretic operations research for space domain awareness, space control autonomy, protected satellite communications; cognitive satellite radios; positioning, navigation, and timing
- Awards: 51 U.S. Patents
- Scientific career
- Workplaces: U.S. Space Force; Air Force Research Laboratory
- Thesis: Statistical Control Paradigms for Structural Vibration Suppression (2004)
- Doctoral advisor: Michael K. Sain
- Website: www.ece.unm.edu/faculty-staff/research-faculty-profiles/khanh-pham.html www.linkedin.com/in/khanh-pham-73924829

Khanh Dai Pham is a Vietnamese-born American aerospace engineer. He is recognized for his work in statistical optimal control theory, game-theoretic operations research of military satellite communications, space control autonomy, and space domain awareness and leadership in government innovation, bringing together agencies, small business, and industry. He is a Fellow of the American Institute of Aeronautics and Astronautics (AIAA), the Air Force Research Laboratory (AFRL), the National Academy of Inventors (NAI), the Institution of Engineering and Technology (IET), the Society of Photo-Optical Instrumentation Engineers (SPIE), the Royal Aeronautical Society (RAeS), the International Association for the Advancement of Space Safety (IAASS), and the Royal Astronomical Society (RAS). He is also a Fellow of the Institute of Electrical and Electronics Engineers (IEEE), the American Astronautical Society (AAS), and the Asia-Pacific Artificial Intelligence Association (AAIA), as well as an Associate Fellow of the Royal Institute of Navigation (RIN).

At the Air Force Research Laboratory/Space Vehicles Directorate, Pham has worked on research, development, and acquisition in areas such as game-theoretic operations research, space domain awareness, space control, military satellite communications, and satellite navigation applications. As an adjunct research professor of electrical and computer engineering at the University of New Mexico, he studies topics like stochastic control and satellite communications. He has also helped encourage small business innovation, supported the Air Force and DoD R&D needs, promoted wider participation in innovation and entrepreneurship, and helped commercialize results from Air Force, AFWERX, and DoD R&D. Pham has published more than 300 works, including books, book chapters, journal articles and conference proceedings, covering areas such as space domain awareness, space control, satellite radios, satellite navigation, dynamic sensor resource allocation, and game-theoretic operations research.

== Early life and education ==
Pham was born in Saigon, Vietnam, to Pham Viet Son and Bang Kim Linh. His grandfathers were Pham Van Son, a historian, war journalist, and military officer, and Bang Ba Lan, a poet, photographer, literature teacher, journalist, and artist. His parents, both Majors in the Republic of Vietnam, served in the U.S.-backed South Vietnam government during the Vietnam War and were prisoners of war from 1975 to 1982. Through the joint U.S.-Vietnam Humanitarian Resettlement Program and Orderly Departure Program Category of Humanitarian Operations, he and his family moved to the U.S. in the early 1990s. At that time, he was a second-year college student in electrical and electronics engineering at the Ho Chi Minh University of Technology and Education in Ho Chi Minh City, Vietnam. After arriving in the U.S., he attended Lincoln High School in Lincoln, Nebraska, graduated three years later. While at Lincoln High School, he also studied the Southeast Community College-Lincoln campus, where he earned a degree of Associate of Applied Science with the highest distinction in electronic systems technology.

In the late 1990s, Pham earned both his Bachelor of Science (magna cum laude) and Master of Science degrees in electrical engineering from University of Nebraska–Lincoln. In 2004 he completed his Doctor of Philosophy in electrical engineering at the University of Notre Dame, supported by the four-year Arthur Schmidt Presidential Fellowship. His research contributed to a better understanding of performance uncertainty quantification and management in stochastic dynamical systems.

== Career ==
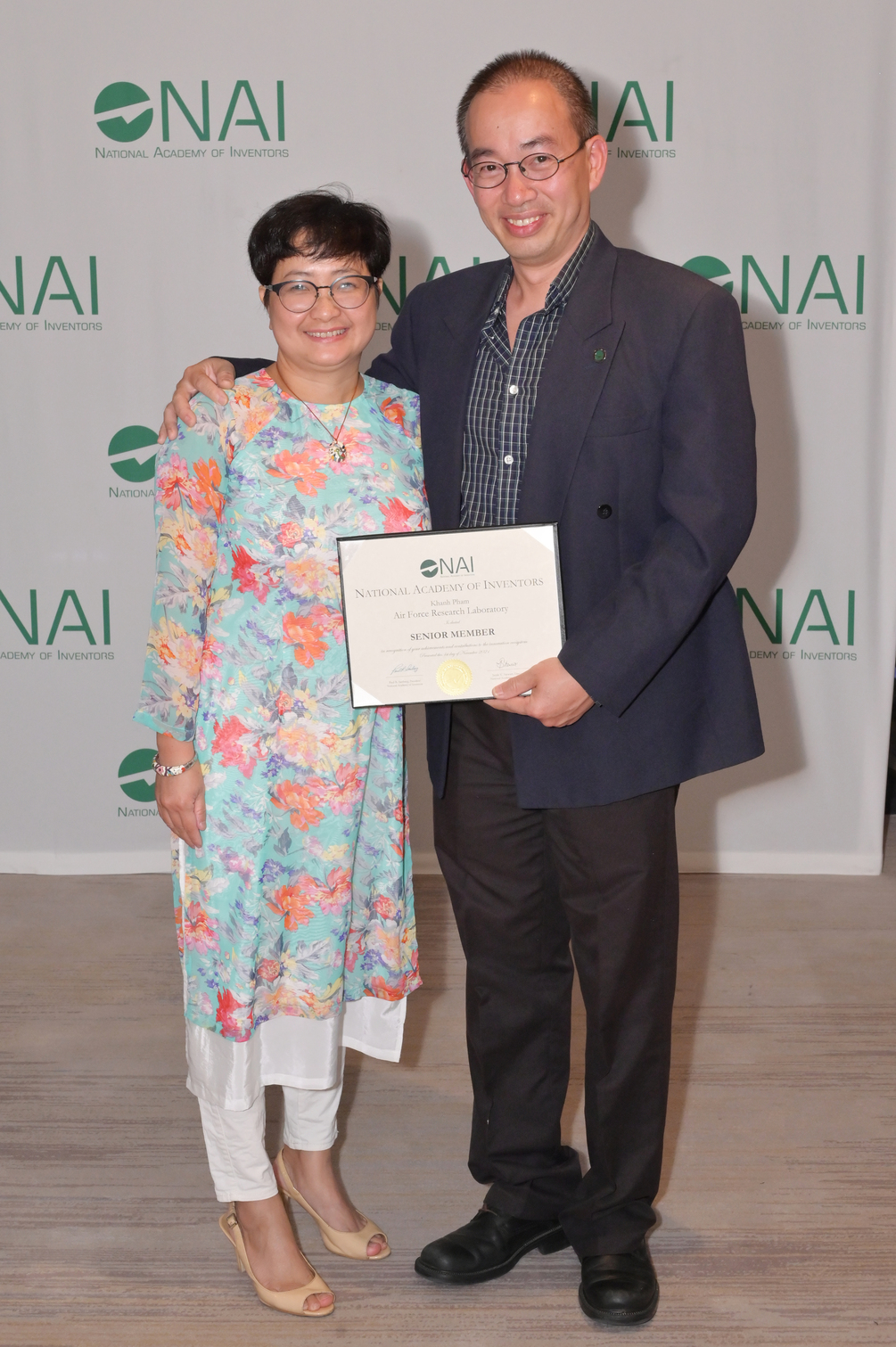
Pham with his wife Huong Nguyen in 2021.

Pham started his professional career at the Air Force Research Laboratory (AFRL) in 2004 as an aerospace engineer, after spending a year as a research associate at the University of Notre Dame. Over more than 20 years, he has held roles such as basic science researcher, technical lead, project manager, contracting officer technical representative, and government lab advisor. He worked on Advanced Spacecraft Mechanisms, Dynamics & Control, Decision Support Systems, Future Space Communications, and Satellite Navigation programs within the Advanced Spacecraft Components Technology, Space Control, and Geospace Communications and Navigation branches. Through these roles, he developed expertise in modeling and simulation, multi-asset autonomy, multi-level data sensor fusion, military communications, and satellite navigation. He applied systems-theoretic science and control engineering principles, along with teamwork and interdisciplinary, to create technical solutions for warfighter engineering problems.

He helped improve analysis for satellite defense control. General Bruce Carlson, Commander of Air Force Materiel Command honored Pham with the Air Force Outstanding Scientist – Junior Civilian Award. His work supported the US Space Force in creating satellite pursuit-evasion methods to test space command & control autonomy. For these research achievements, he received the Air Force Civilian Achievement Medal.

Pham's research, published by Springer Verlag in books such as "Linear-Quadratic Controls in Risk-Averse Decision Making: Performance-Measure Statistics and Control Decision Optimization," ISBN 978-1-4614-5078-8 and "Resilient Controls for Ordering Uncertain Prospects: Change and Response," Springer Optimization and Its Applications, Vol. 98, ISBN 978-3-319-08704-7., introduced new ways to use higher-order statistics in controlling linear-quadratic dynamical systems. His independent studies helped improve how performance variation and risk preferences are managed. The methods he developed are now widely used in advanced modeling and simulation tools for space object localization, decision-making under uncertainty, clock steering, and satellite communication management and control applications. As the need for high-performance engineering systems grows, his books have helped engineers measure and manage uncertainty, showing how to design for both reliability and adaptability in complex aerospace systems.

He was named the DoD Laboratory Scientist of the Quarter for the third quarter of 2019, in recognition of his work in autonomous radio sensing, precision multi-user access, and cognitive radio resource management. His research has led to new technologies for industry and Air Force programs by improving how space communications can handle contested radio environments. Making these technologies more resilient in tough radio conditions supports joint command and control, reliable connectivity, and accurate positioning, navigation, and timing for military operations. This could help enable closer operations in contested warfighting environments.

He continued his studies at the Air War College (AWC) through the Distance Learning program, where he developed strong critical thinking skills about complex national security issues. During his time there, Pham found a deep interest in using systems-based analysis to address real-world security challenges facing the U.S. His work for Special Operations Command was highlighted in his capstone study, where he suggested using ideas from complex adaptive systems science as a possible way to better coordinate U.S. power and foreign policy in response to China's energy security and growing influence in Central Asia.

Pham was recognized for his leadership in modeling and simulation technologies for the U.S. Space Force and Air Force Research Laboratory. He led a team from different fields that developed new defense solutions in missile defense, space control, space situational awareness, secured military satellite communications, resilient timing, as well as training to support DoD STEM efforts. The National Center for Simulation (NCS) named him as one of three people inducted to the NCS Modeling and Simulation (M&S) Hall of Fame Class of 2023. The ceremony took place on October 12, 2023, at the Orange County Convention Center, South Concourse, which is the permanent home of the NCS Modeling and Simulation Hall of Fame.

Recently, Pham has made key contributions to science and the technical development of onboard systems for resilient and local time reference, especially in multi-way time transfer, synchronization, and ensemble timescales. He was the first to apply statistical optimal control theory to clock steering, which led to more precise analyses of local reference times. He also helped develop new frameworks for controlling onboard clock ensembles, using game-theoretic decision optimization to create timescales from different groups of local clocks and align them with external reference timescales through feedback control and federated learning.

== Government services for academia and R&D community at large ==
Since 2004, Pham has advanced his government career from developing technical skills to leading diverse teams of technical professionals in various settings that require planning, cultural awareness, and teamwork. He has encouraged more Asian American Pacific Islander individuals to join Federal service, opening doors for those who might not have considered these careers. At the AFRL, he has taken on roles as an engineer, scientist, and leader, guiding strategy and planning.

Pham has been a research adviser for the National Academies' Associate Research Programs. He creates research opportunities related to military space capabilities for the Air Force Summer Faculty Fellowship programs for American Society of Engineering Education. He has also served on evaluation panels for the National Science Foundation Graduate Fellowship, National Defense Science & Engineering Graduate Fellowship and Young Investigator Research Program at the Air Force Office of Scientific Research. As an adjunct research professor in Electrical and Computer Engineering Department at the University of New Mexico and a board member for the Center for Computational and Applied Mathematics at the California State University at Fullerton, he has served on many dissertation and thesis committees. In these roles, he has mentored many graduate students in science, technology, engineering, and mathematics (STEM) fields. He works with government and academic partners to highlight the importance of the National Science Foundation and DoD National Defense Science & Engineering Graduate Fellowship program for developing the DoD workforce. Pham received the 2018 Society of Asian Scientists and Engineers (SASE) - Leadership of the Year (Government Category) Award and the 2019 SASE - Professional Achievements Award,. He has shown technical leadership and has supported the Asian American Pacific Islander community by providing guidance and opportunities where others may see challenges.

In addition, Pham is concerned with innovation-based business development and technology transfers. He has worked with 100-plus high-tech small businesses and entrepreneurs who represent the growth and development of so many future leaders and engineers, utilizing America's Seed Fund and the like. His technical outreach has impacted multi-million dollars of DoD science and technology investments, managed 100s Small Business Innovative Research/Small Business Technology Transfer contracts and worked closely with many small businesses. In 2018, his efforts earned him the fourth Annual Champion of Small Business and Technology Commercialization Award from the Small Business Technology Council for advancing high-tech small businesses. In 2023, the AFRL - Space Vehicles Directorate recognized his broad impact on technology, research, and business in the DoD STEM community with the SASE Achievement award.

Since 2004, Pham has been a strong advocate for developing game-theoretic operations research in military science, technology, and engineering, especially in space domain awareness, space control autonomy, and protected satellite communications. He has organized and led conferences on sensors and systems for space applications. He has been a distinguished guest lecturer at the 2019 International Conference on Telecommunications in Hanoi, the IEEE Military Communication Conference in Norfolk, and the DoD Innovators Spotlight Series. Each year, he speaks at conferences such as the American Control Conference, IEEE Aerospace Conference, and the IEEE Military Communications Conference, etc., and gives invited talks and tutorials at American universities. From 2015 to 2022, Pham was Senior Editor of IEEE Transactions on Aerospace and Electronic Systems for Intelligent Systems, the guest editor for a special section of Optical Engineering on advances in sensors and systems for space applications, and the guest editor for the IEEE Transactions on Aerospace and Electronic Systems Special Section on Industrial Information Integration in Space Applications from 2021 to 2022.

From 2005 to 2007, Pham was on the Program Committee for the Rocky Mountain Section of the American Astronautical Society's Guidance and Control Conference in Breckenridge, Colorado, where he led closed sessions on Control Techniques for Deployable & Large Structures. Between 2011 and 2014, he was the technical area chair for Human and Autonomous/Unmanned Systems at AIAA. He also served as a panelist, reviewer, author, and chair of sessions and tracks. He was a member of the AIAA Technical Committees on Survivability and Guidance, Navigation and Control from 2010 to 2017.

== Professional achievements and awards ==
In 2017 and 2018, Pham was featured and interviewed for his achievements on "Voice of America", "The Pride of the Vietnamese" - the largest US international broadcasters celebrating Vietnamese Heritage around the world, and the Asian American Engineers of the Year. His achievements show that pursuing fundamental knowledge is central to technological progress, national security, and international leadership. They also highlight the value of DoD's career civilian scientists and engineers.

- Fellow of the American Institute of Aeronautics and Astronautics, 2026
- Fellow of the Institute of Electrical and Electronics Engineers, 2023
- Fellow of the American Astronautical Society, 2023
- Fellow of the Asia-Pacific Artificial Intelligence Association, 2023
- Fellow of the National Academy of Inventors, 2021
- Fellow of the International Association for the Advancement of Space Safety, 2022
- Fellow of the Royal Astronomical Society, 2022
- Fellow of the Institution of Engineering and Technology, 2021
- Fellow of the Royal Aeronautical Society, 2022
- Fellow of the Air Force Research Laboratory, 2020
- Fellow of the Society of Photo-Optical Instrumentation Engineers, 2015
- Associate Fellow of the Royal Institute of Navigation, 2023
- Outstanding Engineer Award, Albuquerque Section of IEEE, 2025
- John McLucas Basic Research Award, 2023
- Inductee of the National Center for Simulation Modeling and Simulation Hall of Fame, 2023
- Society of Asian Scientists and Engineers - Technical/Research/Business Achievement Award, 2023
- Air War College, 2023
- Accumulated 51 U.S. Patents
- Asian American Engineers of the Year Award, 2021
- Innovation Award, 2020
- DoD Lab Scientist of the Quarter Award, 2019
- Society of Asian Scientists and Engineers - Professional Achievements Award, 2019
- Arthur S. Flemming Award in Basic Science, 2018
- Publication of the Year Award, 2009, 2014, 2018, 2019, 2021, and 2023
- Excellence in Technology Transfer Award, 2018 and 2019
- Society of Asian Scientists and Engineers of the Year - Government Leadership Award, 2018
- Small Business and Technology Council 2018 Champion of Small Business Technology Commercialization Award, 2018
- Excellence in Scientific/Technical Achievement Team Award, 2010 and 2011
- Air Force Civilian Achievement Medal, Department of the Air Force, 2009
- Air Force Outstanding Engineer of the Year, Department of the Air Force, 2008
