= Trac Tran =

Trac D. Tran
- Trần Duy Trác
- Education: Massachusetts Institute of Technology; University of Wisconsin - Madison
- Known for: binDCT, pre-/post-filtering, JPEG-XR, structurally random matrices, sparse hyperspectral imaging
- Scientific career
- Fields: Digital signal processing
- Workplaces: Johns Hopkins University
- Thesis: Linear Phase Perfect Reconstruction Filter Bank: Theory, Structure, Design, and Application in Image Compression (1998)
- Academic advisors: Truong Q. Nguyen
- Website: https://thanglong.ece.jhu.edu/

Trac D. Tran received the B.S. and M.S. degrees from the Massachusetts Institute of Technology, Cambridge, in 1993 and 1994, respectively, and the PhD degree from the University of Wisconsin, Madison, in 1998, all in Electrical Engineering. In July 1998, Tran joined the Department of Electrical and Computer Engineering, Johns Hopkins University, Baltimore, MD, where he currently holds the rank of Professor. His research interests are in the field of digital signal processing, particularly in sparse representation, sparse recovery, sampling, multi-rate systems, filter banks, transforms, wavelets, and their applications in signal analysis, compression, processing, and communications. His pioneering research on integer-coefficient transforms and pre-/post-filtering operators has been adopted as critical components of Mozilla Daala, Microsoft Windows Media Video 9, and JPEG-XR (the latest international still-image compression standard ISO/IEC 29199-2).

Tran was named Fellow of the Institute of Electrical and Electronics Engineers (IEEE) in 2014 for contributions to multirate and sparse signal processing.

== Awards and honors ==
- IEEE GRSS Highest Impact Paper Award, 2018
- Second Prize by Information and Inference: A Journal of the IMA, 2017
- IEEE Fellow, 2014
- IEEE Mikio Takagi Best Paper Award, 2012
- Capers and Marion McDonald Award for Excellence in Mentoring and Advising, 2009
- William H. Huggins Excellence in Teaching Award, 2007
- NSF CAREER award, 2001
