= Xuong Nguyen-Huu =

American biochemist (1933–2026)

Xuong Nguyen-Huu (Vietnamese: Nguyễn Hữu Xương; July 14, 1933 – May 11, 2026) was an American biochemist and a pioneer of protein crystallography technology. His research focused on the development of novel methods, such as protein crystallography and cryo-electron microscopy, for the determination of protein structures and biological macromolecules.

== Life and career ==
Nguyen-Huu was born in Vietnam on July 14, 1933. He received his B.S.E.E. in electrical engineering; M.S.E.E. from Ecole Superieure d'Electricite, Paris, France (1957); M.S. in mathematics from University of Paris, Paris (1958); M.S. and Ph.D. in physics from the University of California, Berkeley (1962).

He was a professor emeritus of physics, biology, chemistry and biochemistry at UC San Diego since 1964. He is a pioneer of protein crystallography technology and of the field of Direct Detection Device (DDD) that will be used in Electron Microscopy. He is also inventor of "Xuong’s X-Ray Machine" (or Xuong Machine) in 1975, an X-ray Multiwire Area Detector, which using Multi-wire Proportional Chambers and then Silicon detectors to help researchers map three-dimensional structure of receptor and allowed for high-speed data collection, and can be used to find drugs to kill deadly viruses such as HIV (the AIDS virus), Polio, etc.

His awards include Guggenheim Fellowship (1965–1966), NATO Senior Fellowship (1977), Fogerty Fellowship (Unable to accept, 1984), Union of Pacific Asian Communities Award (1985), UCSD Chancellor Associate Award (1992) and Charles E. Supper Instrumentation Award from American Crystallographic Association (2004). He is also founder of Area Detector Systems Corporation.

Nguyen-Huu served as the President of the Vietnamese Alliance Association, 1976–1992 and was also co-founder and Ex-Chairman of "Boat People SOS Committee" from 1980 to 1990, which worked with another non-profit organizations to obtain visas for Vietnamese refugees (Boat people) and they successfully sent out rescue ships on the South China Sea to pick up drifting boat people, saving more than 3,500.

Nguyen-Huu died on May 11, 2026, at the age of 92.

== Selected patents ==
- Direct collection transmission electron microscopy. With Mark H Ellisman, Stuart Kleinfelder.
- Method of high-energy particle imaging by computing a difference between sampled pixel voltages. With Liang Jin, Robert B Bilh

== Selected publications ==
- Crystal Structure of a Transition State Mimic of the Catalytic Subunit of cAMP-dependent Protein Kinase. With Madhusudan, P. Akamine, and S. S. Taylor. Nature Struc. Biol. 9, 273 2002.
- The Structures of Anthranilate Synthase of Serratia Marcescens Crystallized in the Presence of (i) its substrates, Chorismate and Glutamine, and a Product, Glutamate, and (ii) its End-product Inhibitor, L-tryptophan. With G. Spraggon, C. Kim, M. C. Yee, C. Yanofsky, and S. E. Mills. PNAS 98, 6021 2001.
- Status of the Digital Pixel Array Detector for Protein Crystallography. With P. Datte, A. Birkbeck, E. Beuville, N. Enres, F. Druillole, L. Luo, and J. Millaud. Nuclear Instru. & Methods Phys. Res. A-421, 576 1999.
- ASIC-Based Event-Driven 2D Digital Electron Counter for TEM Imaging. With G.Y. Fan, P. Datte, E. Beuville, J.-F. Beche, J. Millaud, K.H. Downing, F.T. Burkard, and M.H. Ellisman. Ultramicroscopy 70, 107 1998.
