= Quang X. Pham =

Vietnamese American businessman and politician (born 1964)

Quang Pham
- Born: 1964 (age 61–62); Saigon, South Vietnam
- Military career
- Allegiance: United States
- Branch: United States Marine Corps
- Service years: 1986–2002
- Rank: Captain
- Conflicts: Gulf War
- Other work: Businessman, Politician

Quang Pham, a Vietnamese American businessman, veteran, author, and community leader, is noted as the first Vietnamese American to earn naval aviator's wings in the U.S. Marine Corps. His family were refugees of the Vietnam War, immigrating to the United States, where Pham served in the Marine Corps then went on to found multiple pharmaceutical companies.

== Early life ==
Pham was born in 1964 in Saigon, South Vietnam. During the invasion of South Vietnam by the Communist North Vietnamese Army, Quang, his three sisters, and his mother left their ancestral homeland, while the Army of the Republic of Vietnam (ARVN) was defending their country and its capital city of Saigon. His father, Hoa Van Pham, a member of the Republic of Vietnam Air Force, remained in South Vietnam and was captured by the North Vietnamese Army while he was supporting the Republic of Vietnam, resulting in his twelve years in re-education/prison camps.

== Education ==
Pham graduated from the University of California Los Angeles (UCLA), and he went on to complete Marine Corps Officer Candidate School in 1986.

== Career ==
Pham is noted as only the second Vietnamese American to complete the Marines Officer Candidate School program, and the first Vietnamese American to earn naval aviator's wings in the Marine Corps. He served 7 years of active duty, including co-piloting CH-46 helicopter MedEVac missions in the Persian Gulf War, then spent 8 years in the Reserves.

After returning to the civilian economy, Pham engaged himself in the pharmaceutical industry. In 1999, he founded MyDrugRep.com, and later renamed it as LATHIAN Systems, and serving as its chairman and CEO. LATHIAN was first in creating a program a computing system to send physicians' response data to customer-relationship management systems In 2012, D&R Communications acquired LATHIAN, leading to Pham becoming a co-partner of the new D+R LATHIAN.

In 2010, Pham was a candidate for California's Republican nomination in the 47th Congressional District, but dropped his candidacy during the race.

In 2015, Pham founded Espero Pharmaceuticals and Jacksonville Pharmaceuticals and is currently the Chairman and CEO. Espero was called the "fastest growing company" in Northeast Florida in 2017. Due to his efforts with Espero, Pham earned the Florida EY Entrepreneur of the Year Award in 2017 and 2018.

He has served on the boards of the Marines Memorial Association, Orange County Forum, and Chapman University Business School Board of Advisers.

== Personal life ==
Pham and his family immigrated from Vietnam to the United States when Pham was 10 years old and lived in California. Pham and his family moved to Ponte Vedra Beach, Florida in 2011.

== Quotes ==
- "Now talk of exiting the war in Iraq has increased. What will happen to the Iraqis who believed in us? Will we let them down too?"

== Publications ==
Autobiography:

- Pham, Quang X. (2005). A sense of duty : my father, my American journey. New York: Ballante Books. ISBN 0-89141-873-3. OCLC 57005625.

Select op-ed Pieces:

- Pham, Quang X. (27 June 2005). "Duty and deceit". The Boston Globe.
- Pham, Quang X. (December 30, 2006). "Ford's Finest Legacy". The Washington Post.
