= Ngô Đồng =

Vietnamese-American entomologist and martial artist

Ngo Dong
- Born: South Vietnam
- Died: May 15, 2000
- Education: University of Florida
- Known for: Founding Cuong Nhu Oriental Martial Arts

Ngô Đồng (born South Vietnam - died 15 May 2000), known also by the Japanese title O Sensei, was a Vietnam-born naturalised American entomologist and martial arts instructor. He is chiefly known as the founder and grandmaster of the international school of Cuong Nhu Oriental Martial Arts. Having served as a college president in South Vietnam before the fall of Saigon in 1975, he spent time in a re-education camp until escaping in a small boat. He taught entomology at the University of Florida while continuing to guide the international Cuong Nhu martial arts community.

== Biography ==
From 1961 to 1971 he was a professor in the Department of Biology of Hue University, South Vietnam, during which time he founded the Cuong Nhu style of martial arts. After the devastating 1968 Tet Offensive and the communist Massacre at Hue, Grandmaster Dong organized a civil defense organization, the People's Self-Defense Forces of Hue, to help protect the public from the violence spawned by the war. His organization engaged some 25,000 people in a program of karate, games and friendly competition to rebuild morale and spirit during the Vietnam War.

In 1974, Dong earned his PhD in entomology from the University of Florida, Gainesville, and during this period (1971–74) founded and incorporated the first Cuong Nhu Karate club in the United States. He then returned to South Vietnam and served as the President of Da Nang College until the fall of Saigon and the communist victory in 1975. An outspoken opponent of communism, Dong was placed under house arrest in 1975, and spent time in a re-education camp. He and his family escaped by boat to Indonesia and eventually reached the United States in 1977. From then until his retirement he served as a professor in the Department of Entomology and Nematology at the University of Florida in Gainesville.

In 1986 Dong took up long-distance running. He soon completed his first two marathons, on consecutive weekends. His first ultra-marathon was the 100-mile Western States run in Squaw Valley, California. In all, he completed 23 marathons, eight 50-mile ultra-marathons and fourteen 100-mile ultra-marathons.

Upon his retirement from the University of Florida, the City of Gainesville and Alachua County, Florida, honored him by declaring August 14, 1994 as Dr. Ngo Dong Day. To commemorate his life, his family commissioned an oriental plant garden to be built and maintained in his honor at Kanapaha Nature Center in Gainesville. This garden contains plants and flowers that he liked as well as a plaque dedicated to his memory.

== Martial arts ==
As a boy, Dong learned Vovinam, the Vietnamese system of martial arts, from Ngo Quoc Phong, one of the top five students of Vovinam's founder Grandmaster Nguyen Loc. Dong also learned Wing Chun from his two elder brothers, who had studied with Chinese Master Te Kong. Although their father, Ngo Khanh Thuc, was Attorney General of Vietnam, the Ngo brothers tested their fighting skills on the street by engaging hustlers and professional street fighters from the alleys and back streets of Hanoi. After moving south to Huế in 1956 after the partition of Vietnam, Ngo Dong began Shotokan karate training under former Japanese captain Choji Suzuki. After years of training, Ngo Dong earned his fourth degree black belt in Shotokan, and a black belt in judo. Later, Dong studied with American Marine Lt. Ernest H. Cates, a judo and Goshin Jujitsu instructor who had placed first at the U.S. Olympic judo trials. He eventually synthesized his broad martial arts knowledge into his own style, Cuong Nhu, which means "hard-soft" in Vietnamese.

During a special ceremony in May 1994, Grandmaster Dong was promoted to 6th degree in judo, by Sensei Ed Szrejter, then executive director of the U.S. Judo Association. Grandmaster Dong is the 47th judoka out of 20,000 USJA members to reach 6th dan.

The Cuong Nhu Oriental Martial Arts discipline now has over 3,000 active members under the leadership of Grandmaster Quynh Ngo. Cuong Nhu has its roots in Shotokan karate, Wing Chun, boxing, aikido, judo, vovinam and tai chi.

== Escape from Vietnam ==
After his escape from Vietnam in 1977, Dong wrote an account of his escape in a letter to his U.S. students:

Dear Cuong Nhu friends: At last my family and myself got out of the "Red Hell." This is the second time we tried to escape and we succeeded. It was like in a spy movie, I'll tell the whole story later on when we'll meet together. I was indebted to my friend Mr. Vo Dinh Chuc who owned a small boat ... in a small harbor 300 km North of Saigon, consented to bring us along with his family. The two families had to leave Saigon by small groups (two or three people each group) bringing nothing except clothes on the body (we'd be arrested if we brought luggage or money, or went in a group like a family) we changed to a bus and then trucks, at last we arrived at the place at night, we jumped in the boat and fled to the ocean at 9:30 pm June 18. On June 22 we ran out of fuel, food, water. We called SOS for 2 days. We met 14 big ships but they didn't answer our SOS call. At last an Indonesian ship (6500 tons) named Garsa Tiga picked us up in the ocean; by then we had covered already 600km without sleeping. They brought us to Singapore where we had no permission to land, then we arrived Djakarta 27 June, we had to stay aboard two days for investigation because we didn't have papers. A delegation of the United Nations and the US Embassy came to interview us, and we filled out many forms. Then we moved to a Vietnamese refugee camp where 108 other Vietnamese refugees lived there already six months waiting for permission to go to USA, Australia and France. All procedures took a very long time. We hope that Cuong Nhu Karate Association can help us to shorten our stay in Djakarta by sending letters sponsoring my family and my friend's family, Vo Dinh Chuc, the man who saved us in bringing us along with him in his boat. Hope to see you soon. —Ngo Dong

== Sources ==
- Dragon Nhus newsletters.
- Cuong Nhu Founder Ngo Dong.
