= Kimberly Nguyen =

American poet

- Born: September 28, 1997 (age 28)
- Education: Vassar College (A.B.)
- Occupation: Poet
- Website: kimberlynguyenwrites.com

In this article, the surname is Nguyễn but is often simplified to Nguyen in English-language text.

Kimberly Nguyen (born September 28, 1997) is a Vietnamese-American poet and essayist. She is a recipient of an Emerging Voices Fellowship from PEN America, a Poetry Coalition Fellowship from the Academy of American Poets, and numerous other writing awards including a Best of the Net and a Jack McCarthy Book Prize.

== Early life ==
Nguyen was born in Omaha, Nebraska to Vietnamese refugees. Her mother was born in Ho Chi Minh City, Vietnam, and her father was born in a farming village in Sốc Trăng, Vietnam. Her parents met at a refugee detention center in Cambodia and eventually relocated to Omaha, Nebraska where they married. Nguyen is the eldest of 3 children.

Nguyen says that she was "born a writer", selecting a pen on her first birthday during a Chinese-Vietnamese tradition called thôi nôi. She struggled with her identity as a writer early in life, but eventually gave in to her "urge to write". She had a difficult relationship with her parents growing up, which influences her work heavily.

== Education ==
Nguyen attended high school at Roncalli Catholic High School, where she graduated valedictorian in 2015. She was an exceptionally bright student, receiving many awards including an honorable mention and nomination for the 2015 Nebraska All-State Academic Team and the Omaha World Herald Key Staffer Award. After graduating high school, she attended Vassar College and graduated in 2019 with an A.B. in English Literature and Russian Studies. While at Vassar, she studied writing with author and critic Michael Joyce and novelist Amitava Kumar and received a Beatrice Daw Brown Prize for Excellence in Poetry.

== Career ==
Nguyen's early writing career started in journalism, showing a particular knack for investigative journalism. While at Vassar, she wrote for Vassar's weekly student newspaper, The Miscellany News. Her articles include personal essays on being bilingual, grief, and a coincidental connection to Kimarlee Nguyen, a Cambodian-American writer who also attended Vassar before her. Nguyen's most notable article exposed a legal loophole in the state of New York that allowed Vassar and other colleges to pay students below state minimum wage, and backlash from the article ultimately pressured the school to raise the wage.

Nguyen's poems can be found in various journals including perhappened mag, Hobart, and Muzzle Magazine. She has self-published 3 poetry collections: i am made of war (out of print), flesh, and ghosts in the stalks. ghosts in the stalks was briefly a #3 bestseller in Asian-American poetry on Amazon in 2020. Her latest collection, Here I Am Burn Me, came out in October 2022 with Write Bloody Publishing and was briefly a #1 bestseller in Asian-American poetry on Amazon in March 2023 following a viral tweet that gained international attention.

Nguyen was an Emerging Voices Fellow at PEN America in 2021 and was a 2022-2023 Poetry Coalition Fellow at Urban Word NYC through the Academy of American Poets.

=== Fellowships and awards ===
Fellowship/Award	Year Received	Citation
Best of the Net 2023	2023	
Best of the Net Nomination	2022	
Poetry Coalition Fellowship	2022	
Jack McCarthy Book Prize	2022	
Frontier New Poets Award Finalist	2021	
Frontier OPEN Prize Finalist	2021	
PEN America Emerging Voices Fellowship	2021	
Kundiman Mentorship Lab Finalist	2021	
Best of the Net Nomination	2020	
Beatrice Daw Brown Prize for Excellence in Poetry	2019	

Currently, Nguyen lives and works in New York City, NY.

== Activism ==
=== Pay Transparency ===
In addition to being a poet, Nguyen is a contracted UX writer at Citibank. On March 6, 2023, Nguyen published a tweet onto her Twitter account claiming that her company had listed her same role for $32,000-$90,000 more than she was currently making. The tweet immediately went viral, attracting 12.6 million views and quickly making her a visible champion for pay transparency. Screenshots of the tweet were posted on other platforms such as TikTok and Reddit and major news outlets such as BuzzFeed, Good Morning America, CNBC, and The New York Times also picked up the story.
