= Lê Xuân Nhuận =

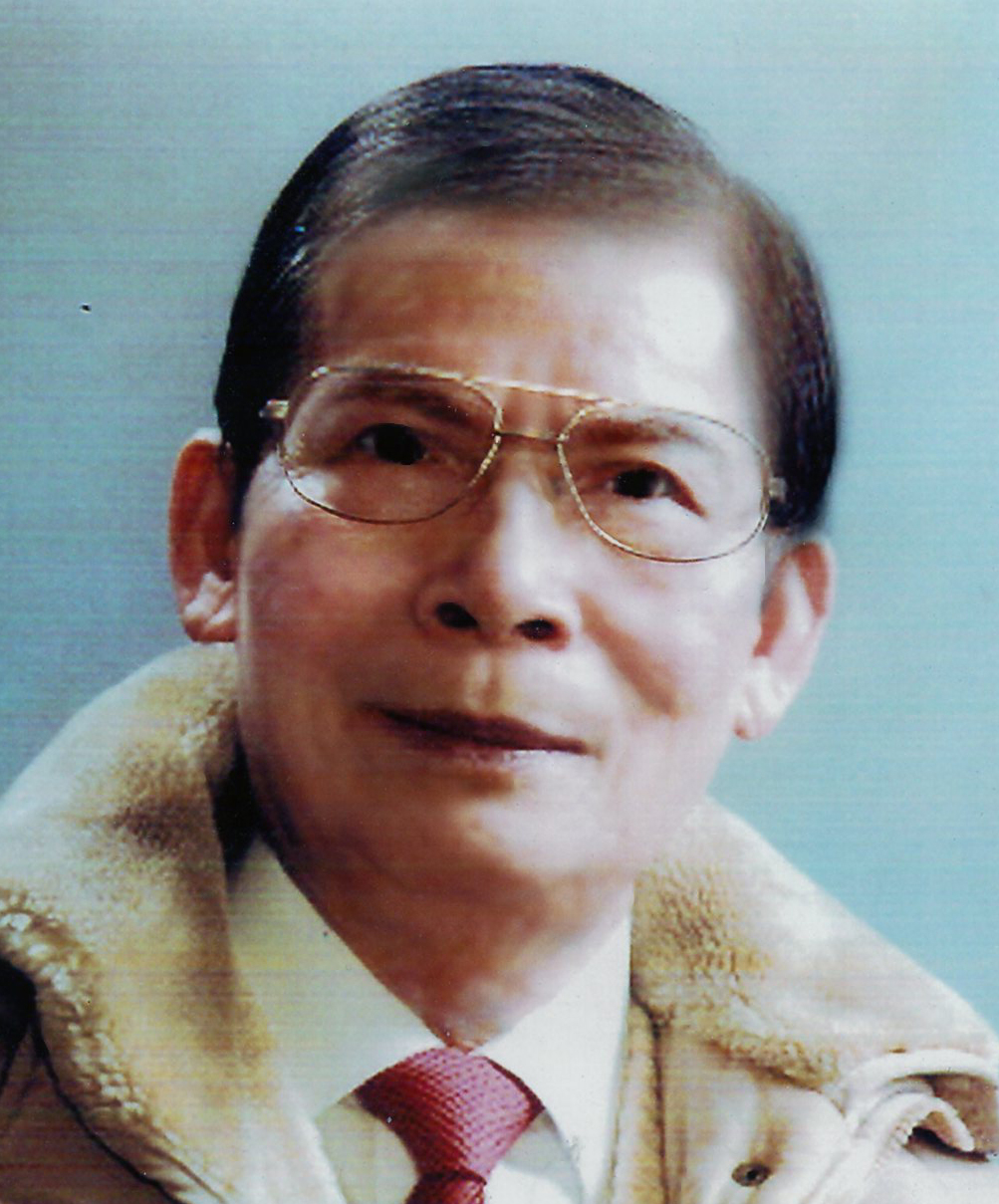
Lê Xuân Nhuận

Lê Xuân Nhuận (born 2 January 1930), also known as Nhuan Xuan Le, is a Vietnamese American poet and writer. He has been a participant in Who's Who in New Poets, inducted as a member of the Poets' Guild, and elected by The International Society of Poets into the International Poetry Hall of Fame under the pen name Thanh-Thanh.

He opposed a series of political regimes in Vietnam: French colonialism, Emperor Bảo Đại's feudalism, President Ngô Đình Diệm's dictatorship, President Nguyễn Văn Thiệu's stratocracy, and communism. He had consequently been periodically fired, arrested, imprisoned, demoted, put under house arrest, and exiled At different times, he served under the French, Bảo Đại, Ngô Đình Diệm, and Nguyễn Văn Thiệu, despite his opposition to their governments. He was admitted to the United States as a political refugee in 1992.

As a poet, he composed his own poems in English and translated other authors' works into English verse. After Poems by Selected Vietnamese, and "Vietnamese Choice Poems", he recently published Dragon & Fairy in Poetry, introducing 102 pieces by 70 poets living in America, Australia, Belgium, Finland, France, Germany, Norway and Vietnam Nhuan X. Le is a member of International PEN (PEN Center America).

== Early life ==
Lê was born in Huế, the capital of Vietnam at the time. His father, a native of Hà Nội in the north, moved to Huế to become an imperial bureaucrat (mandarin). There he met Lê's mother, the daughter of a royal physician under the previous emperor, Khải Định.

Lê attended school in Huế. At the age of 13, his first poems and short stories were published in magazines in Hà Nội, then the literary center of the country. He attended Quốc Học–Huế High School, a school noted for producing many political leaders. He was politically influenced by his teacher, Tráng Cử—the son of Cường Để, an exiled royal who worked to oust the French from Vietnam.

== French occupation and Bảo Đại's administration ==
The French rulers were ousted by the Imperial Japanese Army in March 1945; after that, in August, Emperor Bảo Đại was dethroned by the Vietnamese Communist Party (Việt Minh). Following the end of World War II, French forces re-occupied most parts of Vietnam.

From 1947 to 1954, Lê Xuân Nhuận wrote for the various newspapers in Huế City, especially the two opposition bi-weeklies Công Lý (Justice) and Dân Đen (The Pariah) issued throughout Central Vietnam. He was threatened by both the French Federal (Liêm Phóng Liên Bang) and the Vietnamese Nationalist (Công An Quốc Gia) Security Services.

Nhuận's novel Trai Thời Loạn (Wartime Youths) implied resistance to the French who wanted to re-establish their dominion over Vietnam, and ex-Emperor Bảo Đại who wished to restore his reign. Nhuận was consequently arrested and imprisoned in 1949.

In 1954, he was mobilized as a writer/journalist into the French-supported Vietnamese National Army. He served at the Second Military Region Headquarters as a war correspondent, military press editor, psychological warfare lecturer, and chief of the radio broadcasting bureau "Voice of the Army, Central Vietnam". During that period, Nhuận created the Xây-Dựng literary group and publishing house.

== Ngô Đình Diệm's dictatorship ==
When Ngô Đình Diệm was appointed prime minister by Bảo Đại – then Chief of the State of Vietnam – he was resisted by many people, especially the State of Vietnam's Army headed by General Nguyễn Văn Hinh, son of ex-Premier Nguyễn Văn Tâm, who were both pro-French. The Geneva Conference resulted in dividing the country into two, putting North Vietnam under the Vietnamese communists.

Lê Xuân Nhuận supported Diệm because of U.S. backing and opposition to communism. He refused to obey orders by Nguyễn Văn Hinh and Trương Văn Xương, the Second Military Region Commander, who tried to step up the campaign against Ngô Đình Diệm. Nhuận separated himself from the Headquarters and used the "Voice of the Army from Central Vietnam" to support Diệm in Saigon, the new capital of South Vietnam so that the Hinh and Xương's efforts were ineffective in the Central Region, and this encouraged and helped pro-Diệm elements succeed in the Southern Region.

Nhuận taught, with the USIS (USIA known abroad as USIS) and American Consulate General's help, the first-ever English-by-Radio course for Vietnamese listeners. In 1957, Nhuận's Xây-Dựng group was recognized for its achievements at the pre-1975 National Cultural Festival as one of the main branches of the Vietnam Cultural Tree. During this time, Nhuận also served in the CIO Central Intelligence Organization or SOC Đoàn Công-Tác Đặc-Biệt and taught English at the Duy Tân High School in Buôn Ma Thuột.

Ngô Đình Diệm deposed Bảo Đại (by a referendum in which Nhuận played an active role), and became president of the newly created Republic of Vietnam (Việt Nam Cộng Hòa) in 1955. But Diệm and his government grew gradually arbitrary and lost the support of the people. Nhuan, chief of administrative police in Huế, having contacted the MSUG as the main lecturer for a political and civic course at the Police Department, denounced Ngô Đình Diệm and his faction, the Personalist Labor Revolutionary Party. He was therefore degraded, put under house arrest, and then banished from Huế to Cao Nguyên (now called Tây Nguyên), the officially categorized "malarian and dangerous" region.

== Nguyễn Văn Thiệu's stratocracy ==
After the 1963 November coup in which Ngô Đình Diệm was killed, the R-VN was ruled by generals, including Nguyễn Văn Thiệu and Nguyễn Cao Kỳ; Nhuận was made Chief of National Police (Trưởng Ty Cảnh Sát Quốc Gia) for Quảng Đức Province.

In the 1967 Presidential Election, Nguyễn Cao Kỳ schemed to overthrow Nguyễn Văn Thiệu. Realizing that Thiệu was better than Kỳ, Nhuận, as Director of Police Special Branch, Public Safety & Counter-Intelligence (Giám Đốc Cảnh Sát Đặc Biệt), for Region II and stationed in Pleiku, disclosed the conspiracy to his CIA advisers and asked them to stop the plot. This they did, and Thiệu was elected president. However, Nhuận soon saw signs of Thiệu's stratocracy and officially voiced his opinion, for which he lost his position at the beginning of the 1970s.

Nhuận collaborated with U.S. Phượng Hoàng (Phoenix Program) advisors in Military Region II in Nha Trang to create a training center, where he was also a lecturer. After the 1973 Paris Peace Accords to end the Vietnam War, Nhuận was appointed Director of Police, Special Branch for Region I (while Ngô Quang Trưởng was Commanding General of Military Region I), and stationed in Đà Nẵng, in order to fix its internal affairs as well as neutralize the VC infrastructure. During his one-and-a-half-year tenure, Nhuận succeeded in ending all Vietnamese communist activities, and stabilized the political and religious situation in all those six northern cities of the country, prior to the collapse of the RVN in 1975. He also cooperated with the CIA from 1973 to 1975 in infiltrating Eastern European communist parties and governments with Polish and Hungarian secret agents, which contributed to the collapse of communist systems in the late 1980s.

== Vietnamese communist regime ==
Prior to Black April (Tháng Tư Đen), which culminated in the Vietnam War, Lê Xuân Nhuận was captured by the Viet Cong on 17 April 1975, after the 29 March fall of Da Nang. He was imprisoned in a re-education camp until 20 April 1987.

While imprisoned, Nhuận created many poems in his mind. The pieces he remembered were later published in the United States and Europe, under the title "Cơn Ác Mộng" (The Nightmare). He was eventually granted asylum in the United States, as a former political prisoner.

== New life in the United States ==
On 17 January 1992, Lê Xuân Nhuận came to the United States with his wife and two of his six children, via the Orderly Departure Program. He started his new life by going to US schools, writing memoirs, composing poetry in English, translating Vietnamese poems into English verse, contributing his writings to US and UK magazines and anthologies, and publishing books.

While researching political and religious matters, he discovered that the Marian Apparitions in La Vang, Quảng Trị, Vietnam, were a fabrication (based on various writings by well-known Vietnamese priests, bishops, and Catholic scholars). This was later confirmed by Catholic writer Nguyễn Lý Tưởng, and ultimately Pope John Paul II on the "Bicentenary of Our Lady's Apparitions in La Vang in 1998".

He also revealed the truth about fabricated documents claiming that President Ngô Đình Diệm had donated some US$10,000 or US$15,000 to the Dalai Lama out of a Ramon Magsaysay Prize awarded to the South Vietnamese leader in 1959 or 1962. The president of the Ramon Magsaysay Award Foundation confirmed that "the former President Diem is not a Magsaysay awardee."

He became an American citizen in 1997, was a member of International PEN (PEN Center USA), and is currently a member of PEN America.

== Bibliography ==
Lê Xuân Nhuận's other pseudonyms include Kiều Ngọc (prose), Nguyệt Cầm (drama), Người Thơ (critique), Tú Ngông (satire), and Đức Cố Lê (research). In the US, he contributed poems to more than 40 anthologies of English poetry, and various English magazines and poetry societies. His new works have been published in America:

- Lê Xuân Nhuận. Westminster, CA: Văn Nghệ, 1996.Về Vùng Chiến-Tuyến (Memoirs: Return to the Front Line). ISBN 1-886566-15-1.
- Thanh-Thanh. Fairfield, CA: Xây-Dựng, 1998.Cơn Ác-Mộng (Poetry: The Nightmare). ISBN 978-0-9665293-0-2 - LCCN: 98–90684.
- Lê Xuân Nhuận. San Jose, CA: Xây-Dựng, 2002. Cảnh-Sát-Hoá, Quốc-Sách Yểu-Tử của Việt-Nam Cộng-Hòa (Memoirs: The Police Plan: An R-VN's Aborted National Policy). ISBN 978-0-9665293-7-1 - LCCN: 2001097126.
- Lê Xuân Nhuận. Alameda, CA: Xây-Dựng, 2006. Việt-Nam Cộng-Hoà - Quốc-Sách Yểu-Tử: Cảnh-Sát-Hoá (Memoirs: The Republic of Vietnam - An Aborted National Policy: The Police Plan). ISBN 978-0-9665293-8-8 - LCCN: 2003106623.
- Lê Xuân Nhuận. Alameda, California: Xây-Dựng, 2012. Biến-Loạn Miền Trung (Memoirs: Disturbances in Central Vietnam). ISBN 978-0-9763498-5-3 - LCCN: 2012900099.
- Thanh-Thanh. Alameda, California: Xây-Dựng, 2005. Poems by Selected Vietnamese (Poetry: 100+ verse translations by Thanh-Thanh from originals by 55 authors living in the US, Canada, Australia, Belgium, France, Germany, Norway, and Vietnam). ISBN 978-0-9763498-1-5 - LCCN: 2005906908.
- Thanh-Thanh. Alameda, CA: Xây-Dựng, 2012. Thơ & Người Thơ (Poetry: Bảy Mươi Năm Làm Thơ: Seventy Years of Poetry Writing). ISBN 978-0-9763498-6-0 - LCCN: 2012908820.
- Nhuan Xuan Le. Bloomington, Indiana: Xlibris, 2013. Vietnamese Choice Poems (Poetry: 146 poems by 81 Vietnamese authors living in the U.S. and other countries. The highest-ever number of Vietnamese poets whose works are translated into English verse by a single pen). ISBN 978-1-4931-2196-0. Amazon editors recognized it among their Favorite Books of the Year, Best Books of 2014.
- Thanh-Thanh. Alameda, California: Xây-Dựng, 2021. Dragon & Fairy in Poetry (Poetry: 102 poems and verse translations of pieces by 70 authors living in America, Australia, Belgium, Finland, France, Germany, Norway, and Vietnam). ISBN 978-0-9896535-4-1 - LCCN: 2021902997.
