= Andrea Nguyen =

Vietnamese-American chef

- Born: 1969 (age 56–57); Sai Gon, Vietnam
- Other name: Andrea Quynhgiao Nguyen
- Occupations: food writer and cookbook author
- Years active: 1997-present
- Known for: Vietnamese cuisine
- Notable work: Into the Vietnamese Kitchen, Asian Dumplings, Asian Tofu, The Banh Mi Handbook, The Pho Cookbook, Vietnamese Food Any Day, Ever-Green Vietnamese

Andrea Nguyen (born 1969) is a Vietnamese-born, American teacher, food writer, cookbook author and chef living in the San Francisco area. An expert on Asian cuisine and cooking methods, Nguyen has written numerous cookbooks on the food of her native Vietnam, as well as an account of her family's escape during the Fall of Saigon. Later in life, she turned to plant-based cooking. She writes an active blog, newsletter, as well as articles for newspapers and food magazines and teaches cooking classes throughout the country.

She won a 2018 James Beard Foundation Award (Single Subject) for The Pho Cookbook. She also received two additional James Beard cookbook nominations: Into the Vietnamese Kitchen: Treasured Foodways, Modern Flavors (Best Asian, 2007) and Ever-Green Vietnamese: Super-Fresh Recipes, Starring Plants from Land and Sea (Vegetable-Focused Cooking, 2024).

== Early life ==
Andrea Quynhgiao Nguyen was born in 1969 in Vietnam and fled with her family of seven when Saigon fell in 1975. Fleeing the communist regime, her family emigrated with only enough belongings for a vacation, but brought with them a notebook filled with her mother's recipes. They settled in Southern California and attempted to buy foods they were familiar with, but the dishes were mass-produced and not very tasty. Nguyen's mother suggested they replicate foods from their homeland, by making the dishes themselves. After a childhood spent in San Clemente, Nguyen attended the University of Southern California and graduated with a B.S. in banking and finance and M.A. in communication management.

== Career ==
=== General cookbooks ===
Upon completing her schooling, Nguyen first worked as a bank auditor and then a university administrator, while she and husband were living in Los Angeles before she began writing restaurant reviews.

In 1997, she wrote her first book, an autobiographical tale, Trip to Freedom (1997) which was written to explain her family's migration and the events surrounding the decision to children. Nguyen wrote a letter to pitch an article on her mother's mooncakes to Saveur and they accepted it. She then developed her website and worked on a proposal for her first cookbook. She continued writing articles about the food of Vietnam in various newspapers and magazines, like the Los Angeles Times, Saveur, The Wall Street Journal, and Rodale's Organic Life. Starting fall 2017, she has had a monthly column in Cooking Light called "The Teacher."

Nguyen's first cookbook Into the Vietnamese Kitchen (2006) has been called "indispensable" for those wanting to cook Vietnamese foods, as Nguyen sees culinary history as integrally entwined with culture. Her detailed instructions were clear and precise with photographs and explanatory techniques provided in sidebar. It was a finalist in the 2007 James Beard Foundation Award, as best Asian cookbook and was nominated for best first book and best international cookbook by the International Association of Culinary Professionals that same year. In March 2012, both Into the Vietnamese Kitchen and Nguyen's second cookbook, Asian Dumplings were selected as two of seven cookbooks honored in the Asian section of Cooking Light′s Best 100 Cookbooks of the Past 25 Years Award. Asian Dumplings covered a wide array of dumplings from throughout Asia, dividing the recipes by dough and wrapping type. The detailed instructions included line drawings to demonstrate how to form the dough into traditional shapes, as well as sections on sauces, stocks, seasonings and ingredients and various cooking equipment needed to make the dishes.

Asian Tofu (2012) was more than a guide to making tofu, as Nguyen included buying guides, as well as tips on selecting ready-made tofu. Her recipes featured both vegetarian and meat dishes, which could use either homemade or store-bought tofu and was noted as an "essential" guide. With The Banh Mi Handbook (2014), Nguyen added another layer to her history of cooking in Vietnam, showing how the marriage of French colonial staples, such as the baguette were combined with Asian pâtés, barbecue and pickles to create a "delightful balance of tastes and textures".

Her 2017 book The Pho Cookbook explores variants in the dish, noting that traditionally pho was a simple, rustic soup, which mirrored the sensibility of Hanoi. As it made its way southward toward Saigon, the dish became sweeter and spicier and more cosmopolitan, with custom additions of sauces and herbs, representing the more capitalist influences of the commercialized south. In 2018, Nguyen won a James Beard Award (Single Subject) for The Pho Cookbook.

=== Plant-based cooking ===
Following the release of Vietnamese Food Any Day, Nguyen suffered a midlife, menopause-related health scare. She thus retooled her diet and lifestyle to focus on plant-based cooking, which is basis of traditional Vietnamese cooking. The result of her pivot resulted in Ever-Green Vietnamese: Super-Fresh Recipes, Starring Plants from Land and Sea,(2024). In 2024, Ever-Green Vietnamese: Super-Fresh Recipes, Starring Plants from Land and Sea, was nominated for a James Beard Award (Vegetable-Focused Cooking). It also won an International Association of Culinary Professional award (best photography and styling).

== Additional work ==
Nguyen is a recognized authority on Asian cuisines and has taught cooking classes throughout the United States.

== Bibliography ==
- Bates, Karen Grigsby (November 29, 2014). "'The Banh Mi Handbook': A Guide To A Viet-French Sandwich". Washington, D.C.: NPR. Archived from the original on 15 May 2016.
- Campbell, Lisa (December 1, 2011). "Review: Nguyen, Andrea (text) & Maren Caruso (photogs.) "Asian Tofu: Discover the Best, Make Your Own, and Cook It at Home"". Library Journal. 136 (20). Plain City, Ohio: Media Source Inc. ISSN 0363-0277 – via EBSCOHost.
- Duggan, Tara (November 17, 2014). "Andrea Nguyen adapts Asian recipes to Santa Cruz availability". SF Gate. San Francisco, California. Archived from the original on August 5, 2015.
- Kierzek, Kristine M. (July 29, 2014). "Andrea Nguyen shares secret to sublime banh mi sandwiches in fourth cookbook". Milwaukee Journal Sentinel. Milwaukee, Wisconsin. Archived from the original on 7 November 2016.
- Knoblauch, Mark (July 1, 2014). "Review: "The Banh Mi Handbook: Recipes for Crazy-Delicious Vietnamese Sandwiches" by Andrea Nguyen". Booklist. 110 (21). Chicago, Illinois: American Library Association. ISSN 0006-7385 – via EBSCOHost.
- McKeever, Amy (February 16, 2016). "In Vietnam, Pho Is a Breakfast Tradition Changing With the Times". Eater. Washington, D.C.: Vox Media, Inc. Archived from the original on 27 May 2016.
- Ngo, Quyen (July 4, 2016). "The Bánh Mì Handbook by Andrea Nguyen". Chopsticks Alley. San Jose, California.
- Nguyen, Andrea (25 October 2016). "How to make a great bowl of pho at home". Los Angeles Times. Los Angeles, California. Archived from the original on 27 October 2016.
- Sutton, Judith (November 15, 2006). "Review: Nguyen, Andrea (text) & Leigh Beisch (photogs.) "Into the Vietnamese Kitchen: Treasured Foodways, Modern Flavors"". Library Journal. 131 (19). London, England: Reed Business Information. ISSN 0363-0277 – via EBSCOHost.
- "Andrea Nguyen". Fresh Fiction. 2010. Archived from the original on 11 August 2016.
- "Andrea Nguyen Talks Vietnamese: Fish Sauce, Lemongrass and the Best Pho in San Francisco". SpiceLines. Los Angeles, California. May 14, 2008. Archived from the original on 7 November 2016.
- "Review of "Asian Dumplings: Mastering Gyoza, Spring Rolls, Samosas, and More," by Andrea Nguyen". Publishers Weekly. 256 (29). New York City, New York: PWxyz LLC. July 20, 2009. ISSN 0000-0019 – via EBSCOHost.
