= Minh Dang =

Vietnamese-American independent consultant, speaker

- Born: San Francisco Bay Area, California
- Education: University of California, Berkeley
- Occupation: Private consultant
- Organization(s): Survivor Alliance, Don't Sell Bodies
- Known for: Human trafficking advocacy

Minh Dang is a Vietnamese-American independent consultant, speaker, and advocate on matters of human trafficking and social justice. She is the executive director and Cofounder of Survivor Alliance and was the executive director for Don't Sell Bodies, an anti-human trafficking organization founded by Jada Pinkett Smith. Dang is most known for speaking about her personal experience dealing with child abuse and her advocacy against human trafficking. Dang helped launch the U.S. Senate Caucus to End Human Trafficking with Senators Rob Portman and Richard Blumenthal. Dang received the UC Berkeley Chancellor's Award for Public Service in 2011, the Mark Bingham Award for Excellence in Achievement in 2013, and she was one of fifteen Asian American/Pacific Islander women recognized at the White House as a Champion of Change in 2013. She was also appointed by President Obama to serve on the U.S. Advisory Council to End Human Trafficking.

== Early life ==
Minh Dang was born and raised in the San Francisco Bay Area. When she was ten years old, Dang was sold into sexual slavery by her family with both of her parents profiting off from her work. Her exploitation continued during her high school years and into college.

During her first two years at college, Dang was still enslaved as a sexual worker. After her college tuition was paid, Dang severed ties entirely with her parents. Her high school teachers recalled not suspecting anything was amiss since Dang was an excellent student and athlete.

== Education ==
Dang attended the University of California, Berkeley. In 2006, she received a B.A. in Sociology and in 2013 she received a Master's degree in Social Welfare, with an emphasis on Community Mental Health. Dang earned a PhD from the University of Nottingham in Politics and Contemporary History.

== Career ==
Before graduate school, Dang coordinated the Bonner Leaders AmeriCorps Program at the UC Berkeley Public Service Center. She also served as a Research Fellow and Lead in Survivor Scholarship and Wellbeing at the University of Nottingham's Rights Lab.

From 2014 to 2017, Dang worked as a Team Manager for an IT consulting firm in Emeryville, CA known as The Linde Group.

Dang's work with Survivor Alliance empowers survivors to be leaders in their communities. She also strives to include survivor's ideas in research to enable her to find more effective strategies against sexual slavery.

== Affiliations ==
Dang's human-trafficking story reached the public domain in 2010 through the documentary Sex Slaves in America: Minh's Story aired by MSNBC.

Dang served on the Norma J. Morris Center for Healing and the board of directors for Youth Engagement Advocacy Housing (YEAH), an organization that supports youth who are experiencing homelessness (ages 18–25). She also Co-led weekly Adult Survivors of Child Abuse (ASCA) support groups for six years.

== Publications and presentations ==
Dang presented "Whose shame is it anyway?" at TedxTalk Berkeley in 2017. In her presentation, she shared her journey with human trafficking and empowered other survivors to do the same.

Her PhD research, completed at the University of Nottingham, focused on survivor wellbeing and helping survivors build a prosperous life in freedom.

== Awards ==
In 2011, Dang received a UC Berkeley Chancellor's Award for Public Service. That same year, she was also nominated for the 2021 FreeStarter Award.

In May 2013, Dang was one of fifteen Asian American/Pacific Islander women recognized at the White House as a Champion of Change for efforts to end human trafficking.

In March 2014, The California Alumni Association honored Minh with the Mark Bingham Award for Excellence in Achievement by a Young Alumna.

On May 14, 2015, Womenspace awarded Dang the Barbara Boggs Sigmund Award for her advocacy in ending human trafficking.
