= Tam Minh Pham =

First Vietnamese graduate of West Point (1949–2019)

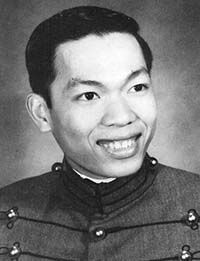
- Born: April 2, 1949
- Died: February 28, 2019 (aged 69) Bethesda, Maryland, U.S.
- Buried: United States Military Academy
- Allegiance: South Vietnam
- Alma mater: United States Military Academy

Tam Minh Pham was the first Vietnamese graduate of the United States Military Academy at West Point. He returned to South Vietnam about a year before the fall of Saigon to teach at the Vietnamese National Military Academy in Da Lat before his arrest of imprisonment for nearly six years after the Fall of Saigon.

== Education and career ==
Tam Minh Pham had been accepted to attend Vietnamese National Military Academy in Da Lat but instead joined two South Korean and a Thai student in a congressionally mandated all-expense-paid program to earn a degree from the prestigious military academy. The program was led by West Point's new superintendent, and Vietnam War veteran, General William Knowlton.

Upon graduation as a second lieutenant, he returned to his native Vietnam, drawn by "what we were taught about duty, honor and country". He served as a Tactical Officer at the Vietnamese National Military Academy from 1974 to 1975 when he and the cadets he led stopped invading North Vietnamese tanks before they fled the academy. He was summoned by the North Vietnamese for re-education but was instead imprisoned for five years and eight months, along with other soldiers who had been trained in the United States.

Following his release as a prisoner of war, he taught English at the Teachers Training College in Saigon. According to a letter he wrote to the USMA alumni magazine Assembly in 1989, he married Chi Kim Trang.

Tam Pham and Chi Trang returned to the United States in May 1991 where he served as a teacher's aide at Cardozo High School in Washington, D.C. Tam Pham was honored at a dinner where he was presented with a USMA class ring to replace the one taken upon his capture in 1975.

Tam Minh Pham was fatally injured by a driver named Michael Dereje Habte, aged 19, and his girlfriend named Taylor Dorothy Fletcher, aged 17, while crossing Midcounty Highway in Gaithersburg, Maryland on February 10, 2019, and died from his injuries two weeks later. He is interred at the United States Military Academy Post Cemetery.
