= Serial entrepreneurship =

Practice of founding multiple businesses sequentially over a career

Serial entrepreneurship, sometimes referred to as serial founding, is the practice of an individual founding multiple businesses sequentially over the course of a career. Serial entrepreneurs typically exit or step back from one venture before starting another, distinguishing them from portfolio entrepreneurs, who operate multiple businesses simultaneously, and novice entrepreneurs, who are founding their first business. A substantial share of new businesses are undertaken by individuals with prior entrepreneurial experience, and academic interest in serial entrepreneurship has grown significantly since the early 2000s.

== Definition and types ==
Serial entrepreneurship is a form of habitual entrepreneurship, a broader category describing individuals with prior business ownership who continuously start new ventures. Serial entrepreneurs exit one venture before entering a subsequent one, distinguishing them from portfolio entrepreneurs, who continue to manage their original business while establishing or acquiring another, and from novice entrepreneurs, who are founding their first venture. While portfolio entrepreneurs manage multiple ventures concurrently, they have been shown to achieve higher levels of firm size and productivity than serial entrepreneurs. In the academic literature, the term "serial entrepreneur" is most commonly applied to the context of owner-managers, while the broader concept also encompasses entrepreneurial investors, corporate entrepreneurs, and freelance founders. Theoretical models propose that this pattern of sequential re-entry is driven by high-skill individuals seeking better matches between their capabilities and business opportunities, rather than permanently exiting to employment after a venture ends.

== Prevalence ==
Estimates of the prevalence of serial entrepreneurship vary by country and methodology. A systematic review of 118 scholarly articles estimated that up to 50% of new ventures are founded by individuals with prior entrepreneurial experience. Across European countries, serial entrepreneurs represent between 18 and 30 percent of all entrepreneurs; in the United States the figure is around 12 to 13 percent. Serial entrepreneurs are a minority of all business owners, yet their firms contribute disproportionately to employment growth and productivity.

== Characteristics ==
Serial entrepreneurs are concentrated in small business sectors such as retail, food services, and personal services, and often operate as sole proprietors. Serial entrepreneurs are more educated and socially connected than novice entrepreneurs, and serial entrepreneurship occurs among both men and women. Shaw and Sørensen found female serial entrepreneurs run firms approximately 97% larger than those of female novice entrepreneurs, though women overall run smaller firms than men. Baird and Morrison compare the process to labour market mobility, in which individuals move between roles seeking improved matches between their skills and opportunities. Serial entrepreneurs who experience business failure do not subsequently adjust their degree of over-optimism, which can affect later venture performance.

== Economic performance and outcomes ==
=== Entrepreneurial learning ===
Prior entrepreneurial experience improves performance in subsequent ventures, though the source of this advantage is debated. Some researchers attribute the gains to learning through practice, while others emphasise innate ability, arguing that high-skill individuals are more motivated to search for better-matched ventures. Burke finds that learning effects are positive but short-lived, and some studies report no consistent performance differences between serial and novice entrepreneurs. Shaw and Sørensen found that second firms of serial entrepreneurs achieved approximately 55% higher sales than their first firms.

Serial entrepreneur firms are larger, grow more rapidly, and are more productive than those founded by first-time entrepreneurs. Shaw and Sørensen found serial entrepreneur firms have approximately 98% greater sales and are around 49% more productive than novice-founded firms after controlling for capital. De Vera and colleagues found, using economy-wide data from Portugal, that serial entrepreneur firms are approximately 50% larger, grow around 20% faster, and are about 23% more productive, with entrepreneur education and lower firm indebtedness the key drivers. Lafontaine and Shaw found that prior business closure strengthens rather than weakens subsequent performance, with sequential ownership producing stronger outcomes than concurrent ownership among small business owners. Burke also found that experienced entrepreneurs invest more frequently in new ventures as informal investors.

=== Institutional context ===
Institutional factors, including bankruptcy law, shape patterns of serial entrepreneurship. Baird and Morrison argue that entrepreneurial skills are portable across ventures, shifting analytical focus from the firm to the individual owner-manager. They also found that Chapter 11 bankruptcy protection creates a lock-in effect, providing financial benefits only to entrepreneurs who remain with existing ventures and thereby delaying the transition to a better-matched business.
