= Nguyen Do =

Vietnamese American poet, translator and journalist

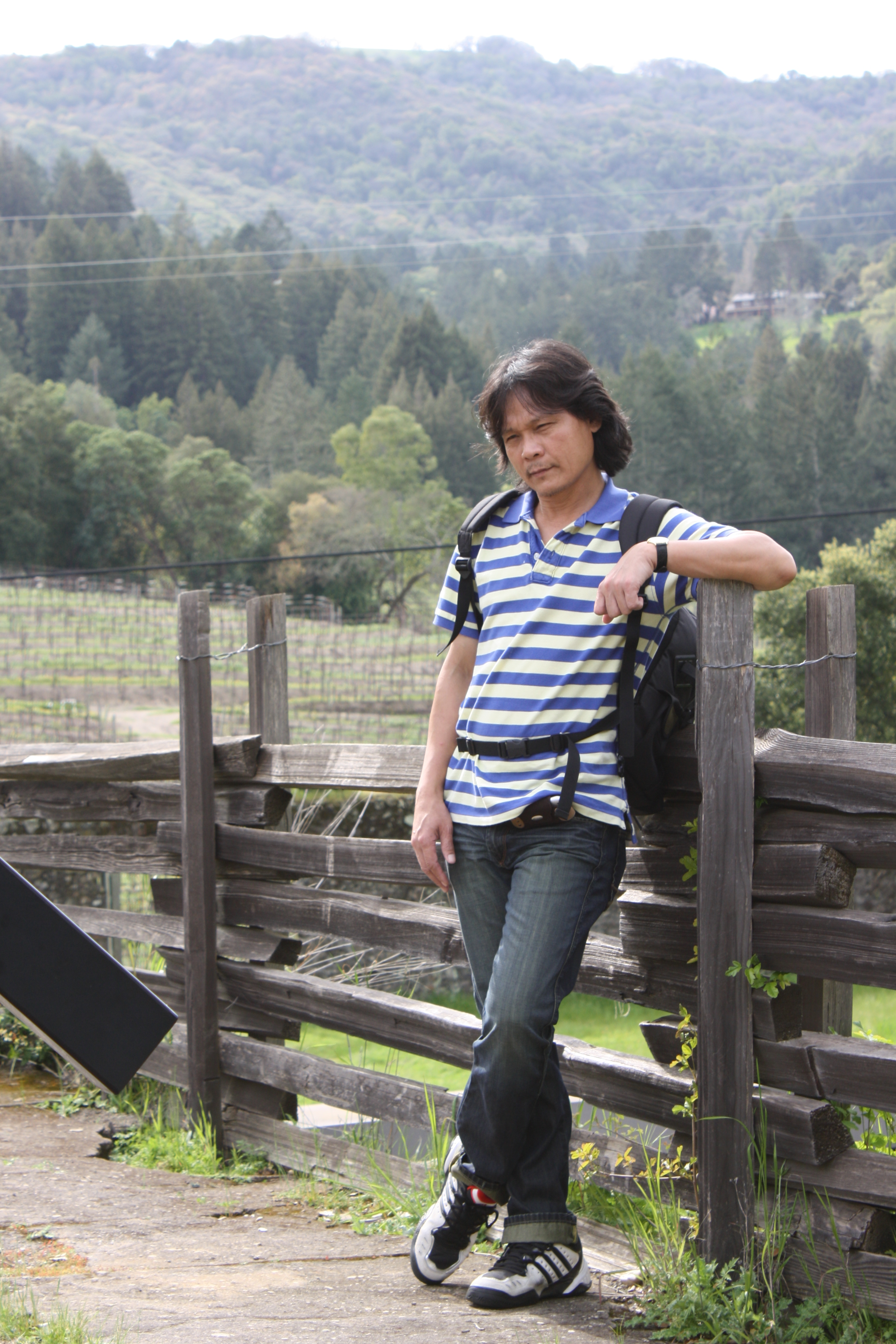
Nguyen Do at Jack London's museum, 2010

Nguyen Do (born 1959) is Nguyễn Đỗ in Vietnamese, the pen name of Dos Nguyen, a Vietnamese American poet, editor, and translator.

Nguyen Do was born in Đông Thái village, Hà Tĩnh Province on December 16, 1959. After earning degrees in surveying from Hanoi Construction College and in literature from Vinh University, he taught at a high school in the city of Pleiku. He then lived for many years in Ho Chi Minh City, where he worked as an editor and reporter for a literary review ‘’ Van Nghe’’ ( Writer Association of Vietnam ) and other newspapers and magazines, before moving to the United States to study English and journalism in 1999.

Nguyen has published thirteen books. His poetry collections include The Fish Wharf and the Autumn Evening (in collaboration with Thanh Thảo, Culture and Information Department of Gialai Kontum province, 1988), The Empty Space (The Publisher of Vietnamese Association Writers, 1991), New Darkness (The Publisher of Vietnamese Association Writers, 2009) and Sitting in the Shade of My Dad (The Publisher of Vietnamese Association Writers, 2026). With American poet Paul Hoover, he edited and translated Black Dog, Black Night, an anthology of contemporary Vietnamese poetry (Milkweed Editions, 2008; eBooks, iBooks, nookBooks editions, 2011], Beyond the Court Gate Selected poetry of Nguyen Trai (Counterpath Press, 2010- Number 10 on the New York Times Bestseller List ), 12+3 selected poetry of Thanh Thao, bilingual edition edited (Association Writers of Vietnam, 2008), and Returning to Con Son Selected poetry of Nguyen Trai, bilingual edition edited and with photographs and poems in six-eight Vietnamese traditional version by poet Nguyen Duy (Saigon Culture Publisher, 2009). He also edited and translated the poetry of Allen Ginsberg, Robert Frost, William Carlos Williams, and others into Vietnamese. Nguyen Do's forthcoming project is a bilingual Vietnamese-English translation of The Story of Kieu, also known as The Tale of Kieu. The project is a collaboration between Nguyen Do, Paul Hoover, and Harvard professor John Stauffer, who provides the afterword.

Nguyen's poetry and his translations have appeared in many anthologies including Litfinder (Cengage Learning), and in poetry magazines around the United States and the world. In 2005, he received a grant from The Poetry Foundation of New York City "for his contribution to the poetry of the world". In 2016 he was chosen one of the five best Southeast Asian poets by South East Asia Globe. In 2022, he was chosen one of top five contemporary Notable Vietnamese Poets by ‘’ Vietcetera Magazine’’. Currently, he resides and is employed by the Government of California in San Francisco Bay, US.
