= List of Vietnamese people =

List of famous or notable Vietnamese people (Người Việt or Người gốc Việt - Vietnamese or Vietnamese-descent). This list is incomplete.

== Art and design ==
=== Fashion ===
- Đặng Thị Minh Hạnh, fashion designer
- Nguyễn Thùy Lâm, model. She competed in Miss Universe 2008 and made into the top 15.
- Trần Thị Hương Giang, model. She competed in Miss World 2009 and made into the top 16.
- Võ Hoàng Yến, model. She competed in Miss Universe 2009 but was unplaced.
- Thuy Diep, fashion designer.
- Thien LE, Vietnamese-Canadian fashion designer and founder of the Thien Le label.
- Chloe Dao, fashion designer, winner of Project Runway Season 2
- Chau Bui, influential media figure in Vietnam and the region.
- H'Hen Niê, represented Vietnam at Miss Universe 2018 and placed in the top 5.
- Công Trí, Vietnamese fashion designer.
- Thảo Nhi Lê, Vietnamese-German model and fashion entrepreneur.

== Arts & Entertainment ==
=== Cinema ===
- Steve Tran, actor and singer
- Maggie Q, actress, fashion model
- Kieu Chinh, actress
- Thuy Trang, actress
- Trà Giang, actress
- Trần Anh Hùng, director
- Ngo Thanh Van, actress
- Dustin Nguyen, actor
- Dat Phan, comedian
- Linh Dan Pham, actress
- Stéphane Ly-Cuong, director, screenwriter, actor
- Kim Nguyen, Vietnamese-Canadian filmmaker, director
- Ringo Le, producer, director, screenwriter
- Ham Tran, producer, director, screenwriter
- Hồ Vĩnh Khoa, actor and model
- Steve Nguyen, producer, director, screenwriter
- Doan Hoang, producer, director, screenwriter
- Anh Duong, actress, model, socialite
- France Nuyen, actress
- Ke Huy Quan, actor
- Hong Chau, actress
- Chí Tài, Vietnamese comedian and actor
- Hoài Linh, Vietnamese comedian and actor

=== Culinary ===
- Hung Huynh, chef, winner of Top Chef Season 3
- Christine Ha, winner of MasterChef Season 3
- Luke Nguyen, Vietnamese Australian chef

=== Literature ===
- Nguyễn Trãi, poet and statesman, one of the 14 Vietnamese national heroes
- Nguyễn Bỉnh Khiêm, poet and politician of the Mạc dynasty
- Nguyễn Du, poet
- Hồ Xuân Hương, poet, dubbed as "The Queen of Nôm poetry".
- Han Mac Tu, poet
- Xuân Diệu, poet, journalist, short-story writer, and literary critic, best known as one of the prominent figures of the twentieth-century Thơ mới (New Poetry) Movement.
- Tố Hữu, poet
- Thuận, novelist
- Bao Ninh, novelist and short-story writer
- Dương Thu Hương, novelist, short-story writer and dissident
- Nguyễn Chí Thiện, poet
- Trần Bích San, writer
- Vương Trung Hiếu, writer
- Doan Van Toai, author, former student leader
- Pham Thi Hoai
- Lan Cao, author of "Monkey Bridge"
- Monique Truong, novelist
- Nam Le author of "The Boat", editor of the Harvard Review
- Bao Phi, Vietnamese-American spoken word artist, writer and activist.
- Quang X. Pham, Vietnamese American businessman, veteran, author, and community leader. Notable as the first Vietnamese American to earn naval aviator's wings in the U.S. Marine Corps.
- Andrew Lam, Vietnamese American author and journalist.
- Andrew X. Pham, a Vietnamese-born American author, founder of Spoonwiz, and recipient of a Guggenheim Fellow, a Whiting Award, and the Kiriyama Prize.
- Aimee Phan, American novelist and educator of Vietnamese descent.
- Ocean Vuong, Vietnamese-American poet, essayist, and novelist. Recipient of the 2014 Ruth Lilly and Dorothy Sargent Rosenberg Poetry Fellowship from the Poetry Foundation, 2016 Whiting Award, and the 2017 T. S. Eliot Prize. Known for his debut novel, On Earth We're Briefly Gorgeous published in 2019.

=== Media ===
- Chu Văn Hợp, Vietnamese-Australian newspaper editor and business person.
- Nguyễn Ngọc Ngạn, Vietnamese-Canadian novelist, television personality and fellow MC of Paris by Night.
- Nguyễn Cao Kỳ Duyên, Vietnamese-American fellow MC for Paris by Night, singer, spokesperson for "Sua Ong Chua"
- Tran Thanh, Vietnamese comedian, actor, director and a major presenter in Vietnamese television.
- Tina Yong, Vietnamese-Australian beauty and lifestyle YouTuber and influencer based in Australia.
- Stephanie Trong, Executive Editor of Nylon and Nylon Guys. Former Exec. Editor of Jane.
- Natalie Tran, video blogger and comedian on YouTube
- Michelle Phan, YouTube make-up guru and spokesperson for Lancôme Paris.
- Anh Do, Vietnamese-born Australian author, actor, comedian, and painter. Has appeared on Australian TV shows such as Thank God You're Here and Good News Week, and was runner-up on Dancing with the Stars in 2007.
- Mychonny, Melbourne-based Vietnamese-Chinese Australian YouTuber.
- The Anh Phan, Vietnamese travel blogger, scholar, author, and lecturer whose work primarily focuses on sustainable consumption, cause-related marketing, and influencer marketing.

=== Music ===
- AMEE, singer best known for being the first solo female artist from St.319 Entertainment. She is the youngest Vietnamese artist to have won at the MAMA Awards for "Best New Asian Artist in Vietnam".
- Chuckie Akenz, Canadian rapper of Vietnamese descent. Raise to popularity with the filming of an amateur rap video called "You Got Beef?"
- Bằng Kiều, singer and former member of bands including Golden Keys, Frangipani, and Watermelon.
- Dam Vinh Hung, singer
- Dang Thai Son, Vietnamese and Canadian classical pianist and in 1980 won the X International Chopin Piano Competition in Warsaw, becoming the first pianist from Asia to win.
- Diễm Liên, singer and actress.
- Don Hồ, Vietnamese American singer known for his appearance in Paris by Night.
- Dương Triệu Vũ, singer
- Hanni (singer), (born Phạm Ngọc Hân, 2004), singer and member of girl group NewJeans
- Hanbin, Vietnamese singer based in South Korea and member of boy group Tempest. He is the first Vietnamese male to become a K-pop idol.
- Hari Won (Esther Lưu), South Korean-born Vietnamese singer, actress and MC in Vietnam.
- Hồ Bích Ngọc, singer and song writer
- Hồ Lệ Thu, singer
- Hong Nhung, singer
- Huong Thuy, singer
- Jack, singer
- keshi, singer
- Khánh Ly, singer
- Kristine Sa, songwriter and singer
- Lam Nhat Tien, singer
- Lam Phương, composer
- Le Tuan Hung, composer, performer, and musicologist
- Leslie (singer), French singer
- Loan Chau, singer
- Lưu Hữu Phước, composer
- Minh Tuyet, singer
- My Linh, singer
- My Tam, composer, songwriter, singer, MYTIME perfume owner
- Niels Lan Doky, pianist
- Như Quỳnh, singer
- Ngoc Son, singer
- Nguyên Lê, musician, composer
- Nguyen Thanh Hien, singer, dancer, and model, contestant of the Hungarian Pop Idol
- Nhat Son, singer
- Nhu Loan, singer
- Phạm Duy, composer and songwriter
- Phi Nhung, vocalist, singer
- Phuong Thanh, singer
- Quan Yeomans, vocalist and guitarist of Regurgitator
- Quang Lê, singer
- Roni Tran Binh Trong, singer, Finnish Idol finalist
- Steve Tran, singer, film & TV actor
- Stevie Hoang, singer
- Tâm Đoan, singer
- Thanh Lam, singer
- Thanh Bui, singer, Australian Idol finalist
- Tran Thu Ha, singer
- Trinh Cong Son, composer and songwriter, painter, and essayist
- Trish Thuy Trang, singer
- Truc Ho, composer, musician turned producer
- Tyga, rapper
- Văn Cao, composer, songwriter, poet, and painter, author of Vietnam's national anthem
- Son Tung MTP, singer-songwriter, actor

=== Painting ===
- Bùi Xuân Phái
- Dinh Q. Lê
- Dương Bích Liên
- Lê Hiền Minh
- Lê Phổ
- Lê Văn Đệ
- Nguyễn Gia Trí
- Nguyễn Khang
- Nguyễn Sáng
- Nguyễn Tư Nghiêm
- Tô Ngọc Vân
- Trần Đông Lương
- Trần Trọng Vũ
- Trần Văn Cẩn

== Business ==
- Phạm Nhật Vượng, Vietnam's first billionaire.
- Nguyễn Thị Phương Thảo, Vietnam's first female billionaire, Vietjet Air.
- Ung Thi, built and operated the Rex Hotel, in Ho Chi Minh City.
- Trung Dung, Vietnamese American businessman and programmer.
- Pham Duc Trung Kien, Vietnamese-American businessman.
- Bill Nguyen, Vietnamese-American technology entrepreneur.
- Hoang Kieu, Vietnamese-born American businessman.
- Thuan Pham, engineer, former CTO of Uber and Coupang

== History and politics (non-exhaustive) ==
Non-exhaustive list of Vietnamese leaders:

=== Kings/Emperors ===
This is the list of notable emperors based on their contributions. For the full list, refer to List of monarchs of Vietnam

- Hùng Vương, the first king according on mythology
- Trưng sisters, revolutionaries and queens who ended the first era of Northern domination
- Lý Nam Đế, revolutionary and monarch who ended the second era of Northern domination
- Ngô Quyền, revolutionary and monarch who ended the third era of Northern domination
- Đinh Tiên Hoàng, first emperor who ended the Anarchy of the 12 warlords
- Lê Đại Hành, founder of the Anterior Lê dynasty, defeated the Song invasion, conquered Champa and developed the empire
- Lý Thái Tổ, founder of the Ly dynasty, relocated the capital to Hanoi and laid the foundation for the empire of more than 200 years
- Lý Thánh Tông, Lý emperor, conqueror, led the empire to the prospered reign Đại Việt
- Trần Nhân Tông, Trần emperor, defeated the Yuan invasion, prominent Buddhist leader and notable poet
- Hồ Quý Ly, founder of the Hồ dynasty, reformer, failed to defense the empire from the invasion of the Ming dynasty which led to the fourth era of Northern domination
- Lê Lợi, revolutionary who ended the fourth era of Northern domination, founder of the Later Lê dynasty
- Lê Thánh Tông, Later Lê emperor, conqueror, legislator, administrative reformer, notable poet, led the empire to the prospered reign of Hồng Đức
- Mạc Đăng Dung, founder of the Mạc dynasty, led the empire during the war with the Revival Lê dynasty
- Quang Trung, emperor of the Tây Sơn dynasty, reformer, one of Tây Sơn uprising leaders, defeated the invasion of the Siam and Qing dynasty
- Gia Long, founder of the Nguyễn dynasty, ended the civil war with Tây Sơn dynasty to reunite the empire, renamed the country to Vietnam, legislator
- Minh Mạng, emperor of the Nguyễn dynasty, conqueror, administrative reformer, expand the empire to its greatest extent
- Bảo Đại, best known as Vietnamese last emperor

=== Presidents ===
- Hồ Chí Minh
- Tôn Đức Thắng
- Nguyễn Hữu Thọ
- Nguyễn Minh Triết
- Trần Đức Lương
- Trường Chinh
- Võ Chí Công
- Lê Đức Anh
- Trương Tấn Sang
- Nguyễn Xuân Phúc
- Võ Văn Thưởng
- Tô Lâm (also General Secretary)

==== Former Republic of Vietnam (South Vietnam) ====
- Ngô Đình Diệm, first President
- Nguyễn Khánh, Chairman of the Revolutionary Military Council in 1964
- Nguyễn Văn Thiệu
- Phan Khắc Sửu
- Trần Văn Hương
- Dương Văn Minh, last President
- Hoàng Gia Hợp, Deputy Minister of Health

=== General Secretary of Communist Party of Vietnam ===
- Đỗ Mười (later General Secretary)
- Lê Duẩn
- Lê Khả Phiêu
- Nguyễn Văn Linh
- Nông Đức Mạnh
- Trường Chinh
- Nguyễn Phú Trọng

=== Prime ministers ===
Socialist Republic of Vietnam

- Phạm Văn Đồng (Prime minister of Democratic Republic of Vietnam)
- Phạm Hùng
- Đỗ Mười
- Võ Văn Kiệt
- Phan Văn Khải
- Nguyễn Tấn Dũng
- Nguyễn Xuân Phúc
- Phạm Minh Chính
- Lê Minh Hưng

==== Former Republic of Vietnam (South Vietnam) ====
- Nguyễn Cao Kỳ
- Tran Thien Khiem
- Tran Van Huong
- Nguyen Xuan Oanh

=== Generals ===
- Lý Thường Kiệt
- Lý Long Tường
- Trần Hưng Đạo
- Phạm Ngũ Lão
- Cao Văn Viên, 4-star general of the Republic of Vietnam
- Lê Minh Đảo
- Lê Nguyên Vỹ, Republic of Vietnam brigadier general, famous for defeating Viet Cong forces in the Battle of An Lộc.
- Ngô Quang Trưởng, Republic of Vietnam lieutenant general, famous for recapturing Huế from Northern communist forces in 1968 Tet Offensive.
- Nguyễn Ngọc Loan, Republic of Vietnam general, famous for defending Saigon against Viet Cong forces in the Tet Offensive.
- Nguyễn Văn Hiếu
- Phạm Văn Đổng
- Trần Văn Hai
- Trần Văn Trà
- Trình Minh Thế
- Nguyễn Thị Định
- Văn Tiến Dũng
- Võ Nguyên Giáp, general, most known for defeating France in the Battle of Dien Bien Phu.
- Hoàng Văn Thái, Battle of Dien Bien Phu's Chief of the General Staff and Viet Cong's highest commander during the Vietnam War.

=== Revolutionaries, politicians, and statesmen (not mentioned above) ===
- Phan Bội Châu
- Phạm Thị Hải Chuyền, Minister of Labour, Invalids and Social Affairs
- Joseph Cao (Cao Quang Ánh), former Louisiana representative in the United States House of Representatives
- Charles Tran Van Lam
- Đinh Xuân Lưu, Vietnamese Ambassador to Poland and Israel
- Lê Đức Thọ, Nobel Peace Prize (declined), 1973
- Hieu Van Le, Lieutenant Governor of New South Wales
- Kaysone Phomvihane, past Laotian Prime Minister (born Nguyen Cai Song)
- Philipp Rösler, German vice-chancellor in Angela Merkel's administration
- Phạm Xuân Ẩn, notable Vietnamese spy, journalist, and correspondent for Time, Reuters and the New York Herald Tribune, stationed in Saigon during the Vietnam War.
- Wayne Cao, Alberta provincial deputy speaker and MLA of the Alberta Legislative Assembly
- Jacques Vergès, lawyer who represented well-known war criminals

== Religion ==
Vietnam's major religions besides Vietnamese folk religion have been Mahayana Buddhism (East Asian Buddhism) and Roman Catholicism. Confucianism and Taoism were also legacies inherited from ancient China, but may be regarded as philosophical rather than strictly religious.

=== Buddhism (Mahayana) ===
- Thích Thanh Từ
- Thich Nhat Hanh
- Thích Nhật Từ
- Thích Quảng Độ
- Thích Quảng Đức, Buddhist who self-immolated.
- Thích Minh Tuệ

=== Christianity ===
==== Roman Catholicism ====
- Nguyễn Văn Thuận, Cardinal
- Philippe Trần Văn Hoài, Monsignor

==== Protestantism ====
- Nguyễn Thị Thuấn, Christian missionary and Women's General Commissioner of the Protestant Church of Vietnam
- Nguyễn Văn Đài, human rights lawyer, democracy activist, and member of the Evangelical Church of Vietnam (North)

== Sciences ==
=== Natural sciences and technology ===
- André Truong Trong Thi, engineer
- Tuan Vo-Dinh, Prof., Director of the Fitzpatrick Institute for Photonics of Duke University
- Nguyen Xuan Vinh, scientist and educator
- Duy-Loan Le
- Tan Le, telecommunications entrepreneur, co-founder of Emotiv, Young Australian of the Year 1998
- Hoàng Tụy, mathematician
- Ngô Bảo Châu, first Vietnamese mathematician to win the Fields Medal
- Trinh Xuan Thuan, astrophysicist
- Van H. Vu, mathematician
- Lê Văn Thiêm, mathematician
- Bui Tuong Phong, computer scientist
- Minh Quang Tran, physicist
- Jane Luu, astrophysicist
- Xuong Nguyen-Huu, biochemist
- Minh Le, computer game developer
- Jordan Nguyen, inventor (mind-controlled wheelchair, etc.)
- Sir Jonathan Van-Tam, former Deputy Chief Medical Officer for England
- Lê Khánh Đồng, medical doctor
- Lam M. Nguyen, computer scientist and applied mathematician
- Quoc V. Le, computer scientist and machine learning pioneer

=== Space travel ===
- Eugene H. Trinh, astronaut
- Pham Tuân, cosmonaut

=== Social sciences ===
- Lê Văn Hưu, historian, author of Đại Việt sử ký
- Ngô Sĩ Liên, historian, author of Đại Việt sử ký toàn thư
- Lê Quý Đôn, historian, encyclopedist, and philosopher during the Revival Lê dynasty
- Phan Huy Chú, historian, encyclopedist during the Nguyễn dynasty
- Trần Trọng Kim, historian, scholar and politician who served as the Prime Minister of the Empire of Vietnam
- Hoang Van Chi, South Vietnamese politician who publicized the Nhân Văn–Giai Phẩm affair in the North under Ho Chi Minh
- Luong Kim Dinh, Catholic priest, scholar and philosopher
- Ngô Văn Doanh, archaeologist, social scientist and cultural researcher
- Nguyễn Hồng Giáp, economist

== Sports ==
- Amy Tran, retired hockey player
- Brandon Nakashima, professional tennis player.
- Carol Huynh, Olympic wrestler.
- Catherine Mai Lan Fox, Olympic swimmer with two gold medals
- Chau Giang, professional poker
- Cung Le, MMA/kickboxing champion and coach
- Dang Van Lam, professional soccer player.
- Danny Graves, MLB baseball player
- Dat Nguyen, NFL football player, Dallas Cowboys assistant linebackers and defensive quality control coach
- David Pham, professional poker player
- François Trinh-Duc, French professional rugby player
- Hoang Xuan Vinh, Vietnam's first Olympic Gold Medalist.
- Howard Bach, badminton player, former world champion (2005)
- Jaylin Williams, NBA basketball player.
- Jim Parque, In 1996 was the only left-handed pitcher on the Olympic baseball team that won a bronze medal in Atlanta.
- Johnny Juzang, NBA basketball player.
- Le Quang Liem, Vietnamese chess player.
- Le Van Cong, Vietnamese sports powerlifter and the first Vietnamese athlete to win a gold medal in the history of the Summer Paralympics.
- Lee Nguyen, professional soccer player
- Ly Hoang Nam, first Vietnamese tennis player to win a Grand Slam trophy.
- Lý Hoàng Sơn, professional basketball player
- Marcel Nguyen, German Vietnamese gymnast.
- Men Nguyen, professional poker player
- Mimi Tran, professional poker player
- Nam Phan, professional MMA Fighter in the UFC
- Nguyen Ngoc Truong Son, chess player
- Nguyen Quang Hai, professional soccer player
- Nguyen Thi Anh Vien, Vietnamese swimmer.
- Nguyen Tien Minh, badminton player, World Badminton Championship bronze medalist (2013)
- Paul Truong, chess coach
- Rob Nguyen, Formula 3000 driver
- Scotty Nguyen, professional poker player
- Tran Hieu Ngan, taekwondo, first Vietnamese winning an Olympic medal (silver)
- Yohan Cabaye, professional soccer player

=== Video Games and Esports ===
- TenZ (Tyson Văn Ngô) former CSGO player, professional Valorant player, Vietnamese Canadian.
- ana (Anathan Phạm), Dota2 International 2-time champion and 2-time Major winner, Vietnamese Chinese Australian.
- Lê "SofM" Quang Duy (pronounced "zuy"), professional League of Legends player.
- Ken Hoang, Super Smash Bros. professional player, Vietnamese American
- MisThy, popular YouTuber, video game streamer.
- ViruSs, video game streamer, producer.
- Minh Le, (Gooseman), Vietnamese Canadian video game programmer who co-created the Half-Life mod Counter-Strike in 1999, starting the Counter-Strike series.
- Dong Nguyen, Flappy Bird mobile game.

== See also ==
- Overseas Vietnamese
- List of Vietnamese Americans
- List of people by nationality
