= My Name Is (TV series) =

Vietnamese television series

- Biến hóa hoàn hảo
- Presented by: Đại Nghĩa
- Judges: Trấn Thành; Hari Won; Chí Tài; Việt Trinh
- Country of origin: Vietnam
- Original language: Vietnamese
- No. of episodes: 13

Production
- Running time: 60 minutes

Original release
- Network: HTV7
- Release: May 7, 2016 – present

Biến Hoá Hoàn Hảo (lit. translated as "Perfect Transformation"; official English translation is My Name Is...) is a Vietnamese reality competition talent show television series. The international version is provided by the Endemol-owned Shine Group. The format for My Name Is... has been aired in several countries byway of localized versions including the United States, Denmark, the Netherlands, Peru and Chile.

Twenty-one contestants were selected after passing local preliminary competitions. The contestants must select one idol who they will mimic as closely as possible in their performances throughout competition. One contestant is eliminated each week until the live finale. Contestants perform with the coaching of three judges: Trấn Thành, Hari Won, Chí Tài.

== Cast ==
The program was hosted by Đại Nghĩa. The judges were Trấn Thành, Hari Won, and Chí Tài. For episodes 6 and 8, Chí Tài was replaced by guest judge Việt Trinh.

== Contestants ==
| Contestant | Idol | Group | Result |
|---|---|---|---|
| Lệ Ngọc | Lệ Quyên | B | Champion |
| Trần Hoàng Yến | Phương Thanh | C | runner-up |
| Tuấn Phong | Đàm Vĩnh Hưng | B | Tied for third |
| Đặng Việt Thái | Noo Phước Thịnh | C | Tied for third |
| Ánh Linh | Giao Linh | A | Semifinal |
| Thu Hòa | Hari Won | B | Semifinal |
| Hà Vân | Hương Lan | C | Semifinal |
| Tố My | Như Quỳnh | A | Quit |
| Đức Phúc | Thành Lộc | A | Wildcard |
| Thái Trinh | Khởi My | A | Wildcard |
| Hoàng Tuấn | Đan Trường | B | Wildcard |
| Mai Trần Đình Thi | Sơn Tùng M-TP | C | Wildcard |
| Ngọc Bảo Anh | Mỹ Tâm | C | Wildcard |
| Khánh Hoàng | Minh Tuyết | B | Round 3 |
| Quang Đại | Mạnh Quỳnh | A | Round 3 |
| Trọng Nghĩa | Trường Vũ | C | Round 2 |
| Đặng Đình Hiển | Quang Lê | B | Round 2 |
| Nguyễn Ngọc Sơn | Ưng Hoàng Phúc | A | Round 2 |
| Huỳnh Thanh Trực | Nguyễn Hưng | C | Round 1 |
| Ngọc Vũ | Ngọc Sơn | B | Round 1 |
| Tùng Lâm | Thu Minh | A | Round 1 |

== Weekly results ==
| Contestant | Idol | Round 1 | Round 2 | Round 3 | Wildcard | Semi-final | Finale |
|---|---|---|---|---|---|---|---|
| Ánh Linh | Giao Linh | safe | safe | safe | N/A | eliminated | |
| Tố My | Như Quỳnh | won | won | won | N/A | gave-up | |
| Thái Trinh | Khởi My | safe | safe | wildcard | eliminated | | |
| Đức Phúc | NSƯT Thành Lộc | safe | safe | at risk | eliminated | | |
| Quang Đại | Mạnh Quỳnh | at risk | at risk | eliminated | | | |
| Nguyễn Ngọc Sơn | Ưng Hoàng Phúc | safe | eliminated | | | | |
| Tùng Lâm | Thu Minh | eliminated | | | | | |
| Lệ Ngọc | Lệ Quyên | safe | safe | won | N/A | safe | champion |
| Tuấn Phong | Đàm Vĩnh Hưng | won | safe | safe | N/A | safe | tied for third |
| Thu Hòa | Hari Won | safe | won | at risk | won | eliminated | |
| Hoàng Tuấn | Đan Trường | safe | safe | wildcard | eliminated | | |
| Khánh Hoàng | Minh Tuyết | at risk | at risk | eliminated | | | |
| Thái Hiền | Quang Lê | safe | eliminated | | | | |
| Ngọc Vũ | Ngọc Sơn | eliminated | | | | | |
| Trần Hoàng Yến | Phương Thanh | won | safe | safe | N/A | won | runner-up |
| Đặng Việt Thái | Noo Phước Thịnh | safe | won | wildcard | saved | safe | tied for third |
| Hà Vân | Hương Lan | safe | safe | won | N/A | eliminated | |
| Mai Trần Đình Thi | Sơn Tùng M-TP | safe | at risk | wildcard | eliminated | | |
| Ngọc Bảo Anh | Mỹ Tâm | safe | safe | saved | eliminated | | |
| Trọng Nghĩa | Trường Vũ | at risk | eliminated | | | | |
| Huỳnh Thanh Trực | Nguyễn Hưng | eliminated | | | | | |
