= 2016 Vietnam Championship Series A Spring Season =

2016 VCS A Spring
- 2016

Tournament information
- Sport: League of Legends
- Dates: 15 January–20 March
- Administrator: Garena Vietnam
- Host: Vietnam
- Teams: 10

Final positions
- Champions: Saigon Jokers
- Runner-up: Full Louis

The 2016 Vietnam Championship Series A Spring Season is the split of the sixth season of Vietnam's fully professional League of Legends. Starting with the 2016 Spring, the official name of the tournament became the Coca-Cola Championship Series.

== Format ==
- Group Stage

- 10 qualified teams

- 3 teams from 2015 VCS A Summer.
- 7 teams from Spring Promotion.

- Round robin format.
- Each match is best of one.
- Each team plays all of the other teams twice.

- Playoffs

- 4 qualified teams.
- Each match is best of five.

== Participants ==
Team(s)	ID
(Vietnam) Boba Marines	BM
(Vietnam) Saigon Jokers	SAJ
(Vietnam) HLG Esports	HLG
(Vietnam) An Phat Ultimate	APU
(Vietnam) Next Gen Esports	NGE
(Vietnam) CyberCore Anonys	CBC
(Vietnam) T Team	TT
(Vietnam) Full Louis	FL
(Vietnam) 269 Gaming	269
(Vietnam) ZOTAC United	ZOT

=== Rosters ===
Teams	Players				
Teams	Top	Jungle	Mid	ADC	Support
Boba Marines	(Vietnam) QTV	(Vietnam) Junie	(Vietnam) Optimus	(Vietnam) Tik	(Vietnam) Archie (Vietnam) KenT (Vietnam) Oc
269 Gaming	(Vietnam) KingJ	(Vietnam) Heaven	(Vietnam) Beyond (Vietnam) ImbaMiBeo	(Vietnam) ADc (Vietnam) Zin	(Vietnam) Sergh
Full Louis	(Vietnam) Ness (Vietnam) Violet	(Vietnam) Sofm (Vietnam) Fury	(Vietnam) KoW (Vietnam) Easynam	(Vietnam) Jeff	(Vietnam) Shinichi
HLG Esports	(Vietnam) EraStyle (Vietnam) Hani	(Vietnam) Shin	(Vietnam) Eazy (Vietnam) Tân	(Vietnam) Freedom	(Vietnam) CooL
Saigon Jokers	(Vietnam) Row (Vietnam) Auzeze	(Vietnam) Jinkey	(Vietnam) Warzone (Vietnam) Lovida	(Vietnam) Slay (Vietnam) Celebrity	(Vietnam) RonOP (Vietnam) TSU
Next Gen Esports	(Vietnam) Ni2 (Vietnam) Nevan	(Vietnam) Fej (Vietnam) MaiAnhDat	(Vietnam) PetLand	(Vietnam) An Trann	(Vietnam) Kyne
An Phat Ultimate	(Vietnam) Hope	(Vietnam) Tarzan	(Vietnam) Kim (Vietnam) Nevermind (Vietnam) Zenius	(Vietnam) HyoJin	(Vietnam) Tear
T Team	(Vietnam) Rebellious	(Vietnam) Tsunami	(Vietnam) Comm (Vietnam) ElnerDevill (Vietnam) Dee (Vietnam) Bii	(Vietnam) Sandy	(Vietnam) Phuong
CyberCore Anonys	(Vietnam) Gony	(Vietnam) Jacob (Vietnam) BlazeS	(Vietnam) Snora (Vietnam) Zephyrus (Vietnam) Raphael	(Vietnam) Sunny	(Vietnam) Hulk
ZOTAC United	(Vietnam) Octopus	(Vietnam) Exo	(Vietnam) Potm	(Vietnam) Clear (Vietnam) SAD	(Vietnam) Kidz (Vietnam) 3RB (Vietnam) Vigoss

== Results ==
=== Group stage ===
- Round robin format.
- Each match is best of one.

#	Team	~	SAJ	269	FL	BM	APU	ZOT	HLG	NGE	CBC	TT	W	L	±
1	Saigon Jokers	SAJ	~	1−1	1−1	1−1	2−0	2−0	2−0	2−0	2−0	2−0	15	3	+12
2	269 Gaming	269	1−1	~	1−1	0−2	2−0	2−0	2−0	2−0	2−0	2−0	14	4	+10
3	Full Louis	FL	1−1	1−1	~	2−0	1−1	2−0	2−0	1−1	1−1	2−0	13	5	+8
4	Boba Marines	BM	1−1	2−0	0−2	~	0−2	1−1	2−0	2−0	2−0	2−0	12	6	+6
5	An Phat Ultimate	APU	0−2	0−2	1−1	2−0	~	1−1	0−2	1−1	2−0	2−0	9	9	+0
6	ZOTAC United	ZOT	0−2	0−2	0−2	1−1	1−1	~	1−1	2−0	2−0	2−0	9	9	+0
7	HLG Esports	HLG	0−2	0−2	0−2	0−2	2−0	1−1	~	1−1	1−1	1−1	6	12	−6
8	Next Gen Esports	NGE	0−2	0−2	1−1	0−2	1−1	0−2	1−1	~	1−1	2−0	6	12	−6
9	CyberCore Anonys	CBC	0−2	0−2	1−1	0−2	0−2	0−2	1−1	1−1	~	1−1	4	14	−10
10	T Team	TT	0−2	0−2	0−2	0−2	0−2	0−2	1−1	0−2	1−1	~	2	18	−16

Tiebreaker

- 5th Place Tiebreaker: ZOTAC United 0−1 An Phat Ultimate
- 7th Place Tiebreaker: HLG Esports 1−0 Next Gen Esports

=== Playoffs ===
Rosters

Teams	Players				
Teams	Top	Jungle	Mid	ADC	Support
Boba Marines	(Vietnam) QTV	(Vietnam) Junie	(Vietnam) Optimus	(Vietnam) Tik	(Vietnam) Archie (Vietnam) KenT (Vietnam) Oc
269 Gaming	(Vietnam) KingJ	(Vietnam) Heaven	(Vietnam) Beyond (Vietnam) ImbaMiBeo	(Vietnam) ADc (Vietnam) Zin	(Vietnam) Sergh
Full Louis	(Vietnam) Ness (Vietnam) Violet	(Vietnam) Fury	(Vietnam) KoW (Vietnam) Easynam	(Vietnam) Sofm (Vietnam) Jeff	(Vietnam) Shinichi
Saigon Jokers	(Vietnam) Row (Vietnam) Auzeze	(Vietnam) Jinkey	(Vietnam) Lovida (Vietnam) Warzone (Vietnam) Henry	(Vietnam) Slay (Vietnam) Celebrity	(Vietnam) RonOP (Vietnam) TSU

Playoffs

Semi-finals
19 March
Full Louis	3
269 Gaming	2
19 March
Saigon Jokers	3
Boba Marines	2

Finals
20 August
Saigon Jokers	3
Full Louis	2
3rd-place match
20 August
269 Gaming	1
Boba Marines	3

== Final standings ==
₫ 1,000,000,000 Vietnamese Dong are spread among the teams as seen below:

Place	Prize	Team	Qualification
1st	₫250,000,000	Saigon Jokers	2016 GPL Spring
2nd	₫170,000,000	Full Louis	
3rd	₫130,000,000	Boba Marines	
4th	₫100,000,000	269 Gaming	
5th	₫85,000,000	An Phat Ultimate	
6th	₫70,000,000	ZOTAC United	2016 VCS A Summer Promotion
7th	₫60,000,000	HLG Esports	2016 VCS A Summer Promotion
8th	₫50,000,000	Next Gen Esports	2016 VCS A Summer Promotion
9th	₫45,000,000	CyberCore Anonys	2016 VCS A Summer Promotion
10th	₫40,000,000	T Team	2016 VCS A Summer Promotion
