= 2015 Vietnam Championship Series A Summer Season =

2015 VCS A Summer
- 2015

Tournament information
- Sport: League of Legends
- Dates: 17 May–24 August
- Administrator: Garena Vietnam
- Host: Vietnam
- Teams: 16

Final positions
- Champions: Boba Marines
- Runner-up: Full Louis

The 2015 Vietnam Championship Series A Summer Season is the fiveth split of the first season of Vietnam's fully professional League of Legends. After the changing of 2015 GPL Spring, VCS A is also changing their format. Teams that joining GPL should also join VCS A.

== Format ==
- 16 qualified teams
- Round Robin format.
- Each match is best of one.
- Each team plays all of the other teams twice.
- Top 3 teams receive a spot for 2016 VCS A Spring

== Participants ==
Team(s)	ID
(Vietnam) Boba Marines	BM
(Vietnam) Saigon Jokers	SAJ
(Vietnam) Saigon Fantastic Five	SF5
(Vietnam) Saigon Panthers	SGP
(Vietnam) Saigon TGA	TGA
(Vietnam) Saigon Dai Binh	DB
(Vietnam) Saigon Bao Cuong	BC
(Vietnam) Full Louis	FL
(Vietnam) Hanoi Dragons	HND
(Vietnam) Ultimate	UTM
(Vietnam) Hanoi Fate	HF
(Vietnam) Hanoi SkyRed	HSR
(Vietnam) Hanoi Phoenix	HNP
(Vietnam) Hanoi Vikings	HNV
(Vietnam) 269 Gaming	269
(Vietnam) ZOTAC United	ZOT

=== Rosters ===
Teams	Players					
Teams	Top	Jungle	Mid	ADC	Support	Coach
Boba Marines	(Vietnam) Archie	(Vietnam) Tik	(Vietnam) QTV	(Vietnam) Optimus	(Vietnam) Junie	
269 Gaming	(Vietnam) KingJ	(Vietnam) Heaven	(Vietnam) Beyond	(Vietnam) Celebrity (Vietnam) Hell	(Vietnam) Sergh	
Bao Cuong	(Vietnam) Moon (Vietnam) Xixi	(Vietnam) Blazes	(Vietnam) Darksider (Vietnam) Pen	(Vietnam) Mugssy	(Vietnam) Hulk	
Dai Binh	(Vietnam) Professor	(Vietnam) Kidz	(Vietnam) KyMeow (Vietnam) Ren	(Vietnam) Bean (Vietnam) StingBoy	(Vietnam) Lord (Vietnam) Wing	
Hanoi Phoenix	(Vietnam) Fatal	(Vietnam) Kim	(Vietnam) Potm (Vietnam) TnStyle	(Vietnam) Suffer	(Vietnam) SkyT (Vietnam) July	
Hanoi Fate	(Vietnam) Slay	(Vietnam) MeoU	(Vietnam) Jinky	(Vietnam) Lysna	(Vietnam) Akiho	
Hanoi Dragons	(Vietnam) JetTrue	(Vietnam) Kid (Vietnam) ProE	(Vietnam) iloda (Vietnam) Sun	(Vietnam) HyoJinn (Vietnam) Kai	(Vietnam) TQK	
Saigon TGA	(Vietnam) Alussula (Vietnam) asuke	(Vietnam) Mazino	(Vietnam) Thone	(Vietnam) Madara	(Vietnam) Kunz	
Full Louis	(Vietnam) Violet	(Vietnam) Sofm	(Vietnam) KoW	(Vietnam) Shyn	(Vietnam) Scary	
Saigon Fantastic Five	(Vietnam) Row	(Vietnam) Genz (Vietnam) Safety (Vietnam) Sena	(Vietnam) Curot (Vietnam) Lovida	(Vietnam) Tartarus	(Vietnam) Puf (Vietnam) Sunny	
Saigon Jokers	(Vietnam) Auzeze	(Vietnam) Jinkey (Vietnam) Safety	(Vietnam) Curot (Vietnam) Lovida	(Vietnam) Minas	(Vietnam) Tsu	
Hanoi SkyRed	(Vietnam) HianRy (Vietnam) LoveTrang (Vietnam) StormEye	(Vietnam) SunShine (Vietnam) Levi	(Vietnam) LilHuy (Vietnam) Toy	(Vietnam) Noway	(Vietnam) Percy (Vietnam) Jessie	
Ultimate	(Vietnam) Hope (Vietnam) Tee	(Vietnam) Tarzan (Vietnam) ImbaMiBeo	(Vietnam) BeeOne	(Vietnam) LuXus	(Vietnam) Nevermore (Vietnam) Tear	
Hanoi Vikings	(Vietnam) Ness	(Vietnam) Arrivals (Vietnam) Xoailinken	(Vietnam) Lucifer	(Vietnam) Berzerker	(Vietnam) Night	
Saigon Panthers	(Vietnam) Bikou	(Vietnam) Dominic (Vietnam) Master	(Vietnam) DarkMoon (Vietnam) Gony	(Vietnam) Dosu	(Vietnam) Boo	
ZOTAC Dung Club	(Vietnam) Alussula (Vietnam) iMeh (Vietnam) Ren	(Vietnam) Young (Vietnam) Exo	(Vietnam) Henry	(Vietnam) SAD	(Vietnam) BaRoiBeo (Vietnam) Vigoss	(Vietnam) Wing

== Results ==
=== Group stage ===
- Round robin format.
- Each match is best of one.

Place	Team	W/L
1	Boba Marines	28-2
2	Full Louis	23-7
3	Saigon Jokers	21-9
4	Saigon Fantastic Five	21-9
5	Hanoi Fate	21-9
6	269 Gaming	20-10
7	Hanoi Dragons	17-13
8	ZOTAC United	14-16
9	Hanoi SkyRed	14-16
10	Hanoi Vikings	12-18
11	Ultimate	12-18
12	Dai Binh	12-18
13	Bao Cuong	10-20
14	Saigon Panthers	7-23
15	Saigon TGA	6-24
16	Hanoi Phoenix	2-28

== Final standings ==
₫ 1,510,000,000 Vietnamese Dong are spread among the teams as seen below:

Place	Prize	Team	Qualification
1st	₫250,000,000	Boba Marines	2016 Spring
2nd	₫180,000,000	Full Louis	2016 Spring
3rd	₫150,000,000	Saigon Jokers	2016 Spring
4th	₫128,000,000	Saigon Fantastic Five	
5th	₫110,000,000	Hanoi Fate	
6th	₫96,000,000	269 Gaming	
7th	₫86,000,000	Hanoi Dragons	
8th	₫76,000,000	ZOTAC United	
9th	₫70,000,000	Hanoi SkyRed	
10th	₫64,000,000	Hanoi Vikings	
11th	₫60,000,000	Ultimate	
12th	₫56,000,000	Dai Binh	
13th	₫52,000,000	Bao Cuong	
14th	₫48,000,000	Saigon Panthers	
15th	₫44,000,000	Saigon TGA	
16th	₫40,000,000	Hanoi Phoenix	
