= Sofm =

Sofm can refer to:

- Self-organizing map, a type of artificial neural network (ANN)
- SofM, a Vietnamese League of Legends player
