= Lệ Quyên =

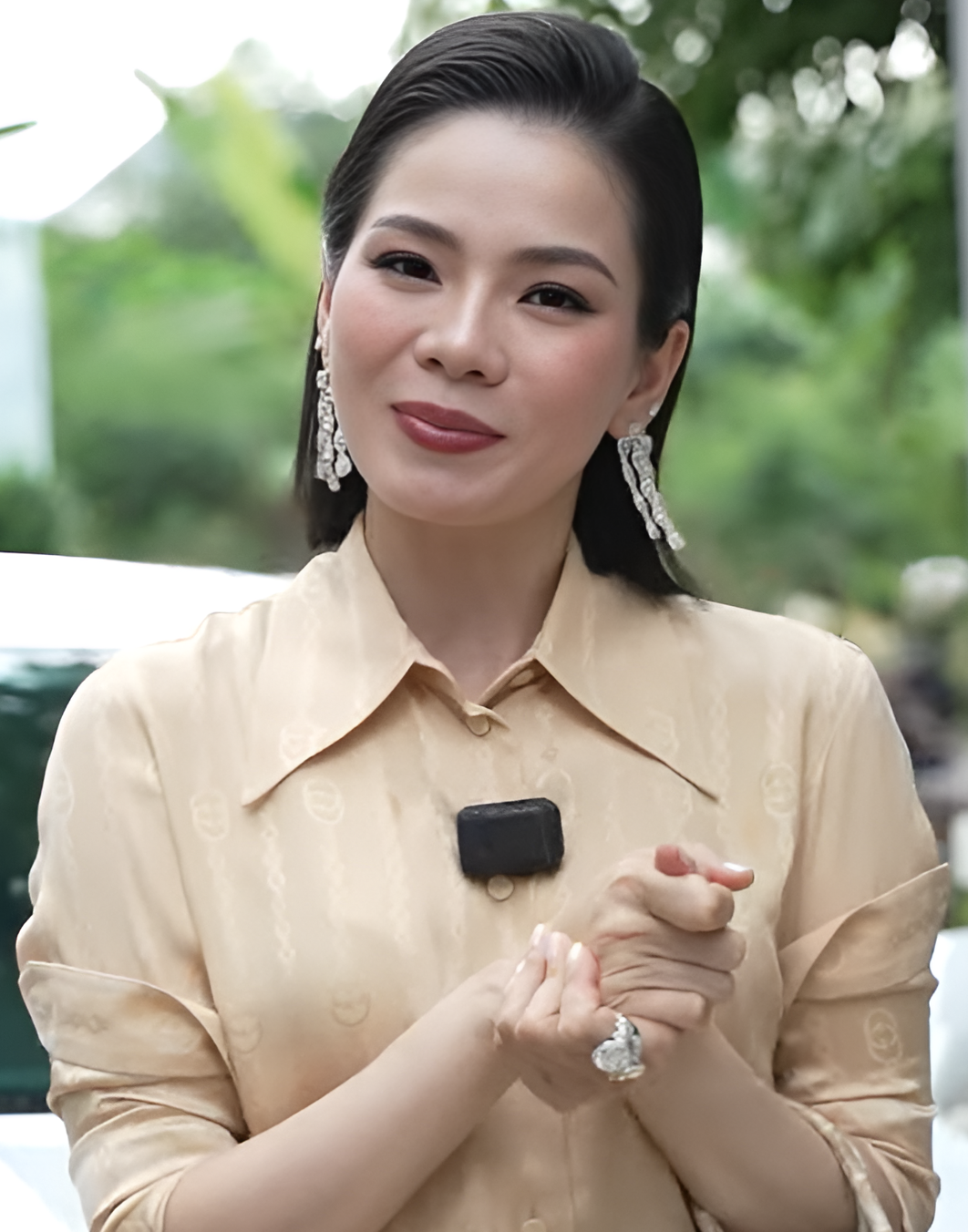
- Lệ Quyên in 2025

Background information
- Born: Vũ Lệ Quyên; 2 April 1981 (age 45); Hanoi, Vietnam
- Genres: pop rock, acoustic, folk
- Occupation: Singer
- Years active: 1999–present
- Label: Viết Tân
- Website: Official Website and Facebook

Vũ Lệ Quyên (born April 2, 1981), known by her stage name Lệ Quyên, is a Vietnamese singer. In 2004, she began her professional singing career with her debut album named Giấc mơ có thật (True Dream). She is known for her series of musical activities, composed of ballad music, old music, pre-war music since the very beginning of her career in the 2000s.

She was born in Hanoi into a family of singing tradition. As her parents were both singers, she was exposed to her interest in singing at an early age. She enrolled at Ha Noi's University of Culture, studying musical theory. In 2004, she began her professional career by releasing her first album Giấc mơ có thật, which gained much success after 6 years singing in Ha Noi and Ho Chi Minh City. She is one of the best-selling singers of all times in Vietnam.

In the late 2000s, she released a series of musical projects that were commercially and critically successful, including albums Lời Yêu Còn Mãi (2006), Lệ Quyên Acoustic (2009), Nếu Như Ngày Đó (2009). Since 2010, she has been releasing special editions of albums following a songwriter theme for each album: Vùng Tóc Nhớ (10 nameless songs of Vũ Thành An, 2014), Còn Trong Kỉ Niệm (Thái Thịnh, 2016), Lệ Quyên & Lam Phương (2016), Lệ Quyên & Trịnh Công Sơn (2018). In 2013, she held the liveshow Q Show, with an 11 billion Vietnam dong budget, the biggest liveshow at that time.

She is well known for her serious, professional devotion in music, and for performing many different genres. She has been called the Queen of Music Tea Room or Queen of Old Songs. She was also a judge of Bolero Idol (2017), Vietnam Idol (2012), X-Factor (2014) and The Voice Vietnam (2015), and also starred in TV drama Bản Lĩnh Người Đẹp (2004), directed by Nguyen Anh Tuan.

== Biography ==
She was born in Hanoi as the youngest of 4 siblings. She was born in a family with singing tradition as her parents were both singers, therefore since early ages, she knew how to sing Northern opera (also originally known as chèo). In 7th grade, her family faced crisis so she and her mother moved to Thai Nguyen of where she enrolled at secondary and highschool Luong Ngoc Quyen. Therefore, many assumed that she was from Thai Nguyen but actually she was born and raised in Ha Noi. In 1999, she passed two universities Ha Noi Music Institute and Ha Noi's University of Art. She decided to enroll at Ha Noi's University of Art. In first year, she attended culture exchange among classes and won first prize. It was the only prize and competition that she had ever attended.

At the end of 1999, her teacher discovered her talent so he introduced her to many coffee shops for students located on Cau Giay street. During this time, she was noticed and later invited to perform as well as cover hits from Thu Phuong, Phuong Thanh, Cam Ly, My Le, My Tam by owners of many music tea rooms in Ha Noi and Ho Chi Minh City. The album Vol. 1- Giấc Mơ Có Thật which was released in 2004 was a collection of hits: Giấc Mơ Có Thật, Hãy Trả Lời Em, Thôi Đừng Chiêm Bao, Phút Giây Hạnh Phúc, Quên Một Cuộc Tình was successful beyond her expectation.

Lệ Quyên was previously married to Lê Đức Huy in 2011 and has a son named Lê Kỳ Anh. However, in 2020, the couple divorced. She is currently dating Lam Bao Chau, an actor and model, since 2019.

== Discography ==
Her professional career officially began in 2002 when she was chosen to sing the theme song from one of the sponsors of SEA Games 22 in Vietnam.

=== 2004: Giấc Mơ Có Thật and unexpected turn ===
Early 2004, she was invited by director Đỗ Thanh Hải to host the show Gala Cười along TV host Thảo Vân but she didn't host as much as singing, even got chance to perform Northern opera – her gifted talent. Also in 2004, she was starred as singer Minh Thuy in 8 episode TV drama Bản Lĩnh Người Đẹp (directed by Nguyễn Anh Tuấn). Besides, she also presented the soundtrack of TV drama Giai Điệu Phố directed by Phạm Hoàng Hà. After Bản Lĩnh Người Đẹp, she was invited to portray leading role of 28 episode TV drama but she denied as she would like to focus on music instead.

In 2004, her agency offered two options: first was to release an album, second was to compete in Sao Mai Điểm Hẹn contest. For being a new face as her, to appear on TV was a big deal of her career, especially Sao Mai Điểm Hẹn 2004 was a hit show at that time. The organization invited her straight to the liveshow night without having to join several elimination rounds. However, she chose to release an album instead in order to prove her name. The album was recorded at Studio Viet Tan, the post-production was proceeded in Ho Chi Minh City.

In middle of 2004, she officially released first studio album – Giấc Mơ Có Thật. The song Hãy Trả Lời Em written by Tuấn Nghĩa won Favorite Song award in Green Wave Awards 2005. All songs of the album were played everywhere since the release date until 2008, as they were continuously played at coffee shops, shopping malls, supermarkets to small restaurants and shops. Despite first album, she already produced many hits: Giấc Mơ Có Thật, Hãy Trả Lời Em, Thôi Đừng Chiêm Bao, Quên Một Cuộc Tình, Phút Giây Hạnh Phúc,...Especially, she was the last singer that enabled to sing foreign songs without having to ask for copyright permission. Sharing about the success beyond expectation, she said: "After listening to all songs in the album, I wonder why did I sing with such a totally unprofessional technique while I could do better. However maybe it's why the audience loved it from me and openly supported me from the very first album".

=== 2005–2007: Mắt Biếc Double and Lời Yêu Còn Mãi ===
In 2005, she collaborated in many albums like Phố Cũ Của Tôi (Tình Khúc Phú Quang) and the song Lãng Đãng Chiều Thu Hà Nội, in Lê Hiếu's Vol. 3 album for the song Con Đường Màu Xanh. On June 16, 2005, she released a duet album featuring Hoàng Thiên Long named Lời Ăn Năn Muộn Màng - Trái Tim Buồn. On September 12, 2006, she invited Tùng Dưong and Tuấn Hiệp for the collaboration of album Mắt Biếc which included plenty of famous love song from Ngô Thụy Miên, Đoàn Chuẩn, Nguyễn Văn Thưởng, Phạm Đình Chương,...This album obtained the highest sale of DIHAVINA.

On January 7, 2007, the second studio album was released as Vol. 2-Lời Yêu Còn Mãi, which included sweet ballad songs however comparing to Giấc Mơ Có Thật, Lời Yêu Còn Mãi was considered to be more diversity as it was written by many songwriters like Tường Vân, Duy Linh, Trương Lê Sơn, Thái Hùng. The album was nicely presented by her unique voice. The album also contained a hit song like the previous album. The song Quay Lại Từ Đầu was also a hit with the slogan of women: " Dung vi chut nhan sac ma den ben em, vi hoa kia roi cung se phai tan" (Don't be with me for my beauty because like flowers, it will eventually die). "Ten songs of the album was from different genres as I hoped that this will be the next chapter of Giấc Mơ Có Thật for those who love my voice from the beginning". Lời Yêu Còn Mãi was the first ever CD to have only Vietnamese songs listed according to copyright law.

On June 6, 2007, she finished the album Mắt Biếc featuring Nguyên Thảo and Xuân Phú as they refreshed the old songs. Besides, she was also featured in some albums of her colleagues such as: Chia Tay Người Ơi (Hoàng Thiên Long), Con Đường Màu Xanh (Lê Hiếu), Vì Anh Đánh Mất (Hồ Ngọc Hà), Tình Yêu Thần Thoại (Đan Trường), Như Mùa Thu Qua (Lam Trường).

=== 2008: Như Giấc Chiêm Bao ===
On November 2, 2008, Lệ Quyên and Tuấn Hưng released a duet album named Như Giấc Chiêm Bao. The album blended of "new" and "old" which presented by both. This was a CD with 10 songs, including 4 duet songs and 6 songs that used to be presented by both and well liked by many to the point it was remixed in slower flow. This album was to prove their collaboration and also friendship as in the past Tuấn Hưng used to announce "I love Lệ Quyên" 1 year previously. Tuấn Hưng shared that his love toward Lệ Quyên was more like an admiration between humans, toward her voice and working ethnic. The album helped them become well liked in Vietnam and overseas. Also during this time, it was rumored that they were in love. After months since the release, the album was sold more than 15,000 copies.

=== 2009: Le Quyen Acoustic, Neu Nhu Ngay Do and moving to the South ===
On December 5, 2009, she released the album Lệ Quyên Acoustic produced by Tuan Trinh Production. This was the next product in the series of acoustic CD under Audiophile format produced by Tuan Trinh Production. The album was released at the same time as album Vol. 3-Nếu Như Ngày Đó however the audience had chance to listen to another side of hers in Lệ Quyên Acoustic. Being wide known as "Queen of Love songs", her voice links with variety of songs about love. A new feature of this album was firstly started with fresh songs like Một Ngày Tinh Khôi, Mưa Ngâu. The main song was Mãi Mãi Bên Em written by Jimmi Nguyễn which used to be nominated at 16th Grammy Awards. This album again showed her powerful yet soft, sophisticated and colorful voice. She had been wishing to release this album in the vinyl format as a desire to recover vinyl. In the liveshow of Bài Hát Tôi Yêu, her performance of Giấc Mơ Mùa Thu was highly complimented as to be the most excellent performance of the liveshow.

Nếu Như Ngày Đó as the third album was released on December 5, 2009, it was also an official introduction to the audience of Ho Chi Minh City, after she had decided to move to Ho Chi Minh City. She was in charge of editing and producing ten songs from various songwriters such as: Hoàng Nhã, Lê Anh Dũng, Hạ Quang Minh, Trương Lê Sơn, Tuấn Nghĩa, Từ Huy, Minh Nhiên, Tường Vân and Quang Mẫn. The remix was done by Tấn Phong, Huỳnh Nhật Tân and Thanh Phương. The album again stated her choice of concept for the album herself: pop ballad songs are well blended with experiences in love, happiness and life. Alongside her powerful voice is her great decision in choosing songs, she was excited and confident to introduce her first album. Nếu Như Ngày Đó, Lầm Lỡ, Tha Thứ Cho Em, Tình Không Như Là Mơ were four of ten songs which later became hits, it's why she put much hope in these four songs as she had gone through emotional time recording them previously. She shared "it's like seeing myself in each song, the most personal feeling that I have been keeping for myself is now widely shared in my own musical space of the album". She said "I love using the term "The lady who sings love songs". If people say we all have 60 years to live in this life, I must say that I have passed half of them already. When I was younger, I tended to think a lot about the past. I have been going through lots of stages of emotion to see myself as a woman. Everyone is free to assume what I'm saying about being a woman". The album Nếu Như Ngày Đó marked her big turn in life as well as her music which was challenging but also contained lots of new hopes. She was trying to overcome first difficulties to stabilize and adapt the flow of the city. Nếu Như Ngày Đó was the opening for the same titled project later. Right after the release of the album, she and her crew continued to generate the project as a series of introducing and releasing the albums professionally across Vietnam and oversea even. Meanwhile, the song Lầm Lỡ was chosen to be the soundtrack of TV drama Nữ Tù Nhân on VTV3 channel.

=== 2010: Khuc Tinh Xua and excessive success with Bolero ===
On August 27, 2010, she held a press conference to introduce her special album Khúc Tình Xưa as a collection of famous songs of the past. The album included 12 songs such as Mưa Nửa Đêm, Tình Lỡ, Hàn Mạc Tử, Sầu Lẻ Bóng,...which was edited by herself. She shared that she had been thinking about a collection of old songs since the beginning of career but at that time, she wasn't experienced as well as sophisticated enough to present this genre.

Alongside the release of album, she also introduced the booklet portraying Vietnamese women through decades which took place in Hội An, Đà Nẵng. The CD was well designed with a classic and nostalgic theme. The design and graphic of this album alone was prepared by her and the team. Besides the booklet was made 2 years previously in Hội An, the design of the album was specially made by fashion designer Công Trí as 10,000 copies was completely handmade. Moreover, the lyric book was written by Lệ Quyên herself in purple ink to bring back the nostalgic vibe of the album itself.

Khúc Tình Xưa boosted her to become one of the top singer in Vietnam. Old songs was passionately presented by herself in each line and each note. The success beyond expectation of the album surprised her as she didn't expect its wide viral. Songs like Tình Lỡ, Sầu Lẻ Bóng was well liked and highly requested by the audience. She was often invited to perform at many concerts like Những Khúc Vọng Xưa, Tình Khúc Vượt Thời Gian,...alongside various famous singers of Vietnam music industry. All of her shows were sold out, ever since, she has been named as Queen of Tearoom or Queen of Old Songs. Speaking about the idea of old song album, she said: "The idea of the album was from long time ago as these songs have a certain special position inside me, as one of my biggest passions. Therefore it's sure to say that there's no way that I'm chasing old song trend like other singers nowadays".

After the success of Giấc Mơ Có Thật, Khúc Tình Xưa was another album to make her even more famous as one of A-list singers of Vietnam.

At the end of 2010, it was suspected that she was pregnant. However she never confirmed the rumor widely until the performance with a belly bum at Green Wave 2010 show. Also in this show, she was one of the Top 5 Favorite Singers.

=== 2011: De Nho Mot Thoi Ta Da Yeu, Khuc Tinh Xua 2 – Tra Lai Thoi Gian and first liveshow ===
One day before the wedding, she still performed at White Ball liveshow of Dam Vinh Hung. Because all the guest singers joined Dam Vinh Hung's liveshow in Ha Noi, therefore she could invite all of them for wedding later. On January 1, 2011, she and her spouse Duc Huy held a wedding in Melia Hotel Ha Noi. A lot of famous singers were invited such as: Dam Vinh Hung, My Dung, Ho Ngoc Ha, Tuan Hung, Le Hieu, Minh Quan, Vu Thu Phuong...Her spouse is the nephew of songwriter Le Quang as well as the owner of Không Tên music tea room-one of the most famous tea room in Ho Chi Minh City.

On May 9, 2011, right at the full month of her son Le Ky Anh was also the release date of her fourth studio album Vol. 4 – Để Nhớ Một Thời Ta Đã Yêu which included 9 songs from: Thai Thinh, Tuong Van, Vinh Tam, A. Tuan....Some songs like Để Nhớ Một Thời Ta Đã Yêu, Nỗi Đau Ngự Trị, Tìm Lại Lần Nữa, Hãy Để Em Ra Đi were well liked and became hits.

On December 10, 2011, she released the next album of the project Khúc Tình Xưa titled Trả Lại Thời Gian including 11 immortal love songs: Trả Lại Thời Gian, Ai Khổ Vì Ai, Sang Ngang, Mưa Rừng, Nửa Đêm Ngoài Phố,... Especially, the album firstly marked her first time collaboration with singer Quang Le for the song Sầu Tím Thiệp Hồng. Alongside the release, she also held the first liveshow of her career at Saigon Opera House on December 25, 2011, the guests were Huong Lan, Dam Vinh Hung, Quang Dung, Quang Le. Like the expectation, all the tickets was sold out one month prior the official date. Some who didn't get the ticker still came to Saigon Opera House in the hope of getting the ticket from black markets. Throughout the liveshow, with the performances of 30 songs in total, without a host and grand preparation, she and guest singers still impressed the audience with immortal songs.

=== 2012: Tinh Khuc Yeu Thuong ===
On June 6, 2012, she released new album Tình Khúc Yêu Thương including 12 ballad songs from last decade such as Biển Cạn, Hoa Sữa, Em Sẽ Nhớ Mãi, Bên Em Là Biển Rộng, Chia Tay Tình Đầu,...In spite of being old songs, thank to her voice, these songs were brought to the new light and new spirit in her very own way. On June 22, 2012, she held another same titled liveshow at Hoa Binh Theater. The liveshow had the appearance of A-list singers: Thu Minh, Hien Thuc, Uyen Linh, Ho Ngoc Ha and special attendance of actor Huu Chau.

On August 27, 2012, VLT Lawyers sent official statement to 9 websites which had violated copyright law to proceed 15,3 billion Vietnam dong payment for Lệ Quyên and Viet Tan Production as the deadline was September 15, 2012; as well as asking to stop using her songs illegally. Nine music streaming websites violated the law were: www.mp3.zing.vn (Zing), www.nhaccuatui.com, www.hcm.nhac.vui.vn, www.teenpro.vn, www.funring.vn, www.imuzik.com.vn, www.ringtunes.com.vn, www.musicmusic.vn, www.music.go.vn. Until September 20, 2012, VLT Lawyers which represented Le Quyen sued four websites that didn't accomplish the payment. This was a big law court along with 1 billion law court of singer My Tam.

At the end of 2012, she released DVD liveshow Tinh Khuc Yeu Thuong as a contribution to the audience. The DVD was long time edited which was up 6 months by herself, as the liveshow was recorded by 8 HD quality recording in order to bring the best meaningful and highest quality gift to the audience.

=== 2013: Con Tim Dai Kho, Dong Thoi Gian and Q Show – 15th Anniversary ===
On September 9, 2013, she held a press conference to introduce two albums with two contrast style. The album Vol. 5 – Con Tim Dai Kho including 8 songs which was especially designed for her as she was confident to conquer younger audience with songs written by: Truong Le Son, Hoang Nha, Thai Thinh, Luong Bang Quang,... As the explanation for two albums at the same time, she said that she was in rush to prepare next liveshow. As expected, those songs Nếu Em Được Chọn Lựa, Con Tim Dại Khờ, Quá Muộn Màng, Ta Đã Từng Yêu, Chôn Giấu Một Tình Yêu,....became hits as well as well liked by the audiences. For Dòng Thời Gian, this was the first time she experienced pre-war songs. The album included 12 famous songs from various songwriters such as: Ngo Thuy Mien, Truong Sa, Pham Dinh Chuong, Pham Manh Cuong,...Although those were old love songs, they were refreshed to impressively bring the best vibe to the audience.

On October 7, 2013, at White Palace Conference Center (Ho Chi Minh City), she held press conference to announce the next liveshow as 15th anniversary of her career – Q Show. The liveshow was invested with more than 11 billion Vietnam dong despite many difficulties in ticket selling at that time. In the press conference, director Tran Vi My and 5 guest singers of the liveshow: Dam Vinh Hung, Quang Dung, Tuan Hung, Quang Le, Duong Trieu Vu together shared their roles in Q Show. Artist Hong Van was the host of the show. She performed 5 different genres as this was the first time she experienced contemporary folk songs – one of the top music genres of Vietnam. On October 26, 2013, she officially launched ticket selling in both Ho Chi Minh City and Ha Noi. Despite difficult period of time and the high price for the tickets (500.000–3.600.000 in Ho Chi Minh City and 800.000–4.000.000 in Ha Noi), the ticket was sold out after only two weeks. Especially, she set a record for the highest ticket price with 20 million Vietnam dong for a pair of ticket. In December 7 and 14 2013, at Hoa Binh Theater and National Conference Center Ha Noi was still crowded as she launched Q Show with the attendance of more than 7,500 audiences and performed 42 songs from pop, ballad, bolero, pre-war and contemporary.

=== 2014: Vung Toc Nho (10 nameless songs) and Liveshow Vu Thanh An & Love Songs ===
On March 15, 2014, the vinyl Le Quyen Acoustic was released by Giao Huong Xanh Company's Films. This was one of the best selling of all times by her.

On April 9, 2014, at Ho Chi Minh City, she introduced DVD Q Show after 5 month editing. The DVD included 32 performances of Q Show and directed by Tran Vi My alongside guest singers such as Dam Vinh Hung, Quang Dung, Tuan Hung, Quang Le and Duong Trieu Vu and special hosting of artist Hong Van. Through the DVD, she would like to gift the audience the contribution and hope that everyone would enjoy it. Q Show was the best selling DVD in Vietnam and oversea. After the release, she brought Q Show to other audiences from 10 different countries in Europe, and 30 states of America, as well as Sydney and Melbourne in Australia in May, June, July, September and November. She guaranteed her live performance would be still good despite bad conditions oversea. Concerning live singing, she shared that: "Sometimes I feel disappointed while I had to perform live under poor condition while others were lip-syncing comfortably. I used to be requested to lipsync at big shows to secure the performance quality but I always chose to sing live. It's my self respect for the career that I'm pursuing. Lipsync is nothing than lying to the audience".

Early June 2014, 10 untitled songs written by Vu Thanh An was officially righted for recording and being performed in Viet Nam. She was the only singer that was invited to record the album exclusively, as well as receive special payment for this CD as a part of the payment would be donated for Teresa Charities operated by Vu Thanh An himself. The foundation intends to help unfortunate elders. After 4 months of preparation, the CD was finished. Since the theme of the CD was all about nostalgia, she decided to proceed a bonus booklet as fashion designer Hoang Hai and make up artist Ho Khanh were asked to prepare the most perfect looks for the booklet to match the vibe of the CD itself. She shared: "I put lots of effort to produce this with the bottom of my heart as an appreciation for timeless songs of Vu Thanh An".

On November 7, 2014, she released another new album Vùng Tóc Nhớ including 10 untitled songs by Vu Thanh An which had been famous to everyone over the last 50 years. Previous singers had already performed all the songs successfully however there were still mistakes regarding the lyrics. Therefore, the songwriter himself corrected each note and each lyric before handing Le Quyen the final pieces for recording progress. He expected it to be the most completed version to pass to later generation. After discussing with the songwriter, it was assured to be the most accurate versions to deliver to the audience, as the songwriter hoped anyone who would cover these songs in the future would follow Le Quyen's versions. For example, Untitled song number 9 contained "Một lần đã trao nhau" while it should be "Một lần đã cho nhau". Besides, "Một đời chỉ nuôi ảo giác mà thôi" was limited. In Untitled song number 7, there was "Tâm sự rồi đêm đắng" while it should be "Tâm sự rồi đến đắng". Also in the press conference of the CD, she shared that she was afraid that "people had been customized with previous versions from other singers, so they would be complaining to listen to my versions instead". Besides, she also shared that she had spent lots of time discussing with the legal copyright owner in order to record all the songs correctly following Vu Thanh An's request. Moreover, she was struggling to demonstrate each song as they were all difficult as she had also spent lots of time discussing with many songwriters to bring out the best versions. According to her, Vu Thanh An demanded that she must insert emotion along with singing technique yet not so "showing off". Therefore, she had to decrease her original voice to fully present the song. Untitled song number 7 was the most difficult one as she had to perform it based on acoustic version of Vinh Tam.

When being interviewed regarding Le Quyen's voice, songwriter Vu Thanh An shared: Many singers was born in each era as a mean to bring happiness for everyone. I have been listening to my songs and each of them have their own ways of demonstrating the song in their own world. Le Quyen is unique. In her, I could see a beauty and modern voice but there is something like love between humans underneath. All of the untitled songs must have been linked with a secret, maybe it's why he didn't name each song separately? However the most important is the core of music as Vu Thanh An is the example of those artists who create art with every fiber of their hearts. When he was interviewed about the new album of Lệ Quyên, he said: "I'm glad because there're more people appreciate my creations, especially younger audiences. Hopefully those are unlucky in love will find comfort in those untitled songs". Until now, although being widely appreciated by many, he still keeps living a simple life: "I'm thankful for this life as even in pain, I still search for the way out. I'm thankful for chances that I'm given, as well as love from everyone". Maybe it's why all of his love songs, even some was unfinished, or so much painful, the audience could be able to search for hopes at the end of each.

On December 27, 2014, Vu Thanh An and Love Songs was held at Hoa Binh Theater (Ho Chi Minh City) as being a special concert of Le Quyen when she gave 25 memorable performances in the concert. So far, Tình Khúc Vượt Thời Gian was usually performed by many artists but in this concert, it was an exception to have only one singer to perform. It was also the first concert contributed to untitled songs of Vu Thanh An after nearly 39 years of not being widely released in Vietnam. With sensual voice of Le Quyen, three male guest singers Duc Tuan, Le Hieu and Ho Trung Dung also brought Vu Thanh An's creations into limelight. The theater was filled with the attendance of more than 2,500 audiences. Through the voice of Le Quyen, they traveled back to the land of memories filled with love and also separation. Vu Thanh An himself carefully corrected each note, each lyric before handing Le Quyen the final pieces so she could perform live nationally. All songs was remixed added her unique voice delivered the audience new vibes from timeless songs of Vu Thanh An.

=== 2015: Khuc Tinh Xua 3 - Dem Tam Su, Le Quyen & Vu Thanh An - Nameless Song Liveshow ===
In International Women's Day 2015, the third album of Khúc Tình Xưa series was released titled Đêm Tâm Sự as she shared "As the plan, this album should have been released before Lunar New Year. However, I wasn't satisfied with all the mixes because I wanted them to be carefully treated. Since I know that the audience love this series". The album included 11 old songs which had been carefully edited by herself such as: Đêm Tâm Sự, Sương Lạnh Chiều Đông, Chuyến Tàu Hoàng Hôn, Kiếp Cầm Ca,....was bolero masterpieces, Lệ Quyên once again seeded the audience with as sweet as honey audios. Especially, two songs Hoa Nở Về Đêm (written by Manh Phat) and Chuyến Tàu Hoàng Hôn (written Minh Ky & Hoai Linh) were finally granted legal release after 50 years of ban. The album was released 4 years after the release of Khúc Tình Xưa 2 - Trả Lại Thời Gian (2011). The process of choosing 11 songs for this album was challenging as 2 previous albums had been greatly successful for their music and idea syndication. Therefore, Khúc Tình Xưa 3 continued to deliver a whole new creation to the audience. Moreover, male singer Thái Châu was also featured in the song Đêm Tâm Sự.

On July 23, 2015, the press conference for the launch of liveshow Vũ Thành An & Lệ Quyên - Tình Khúc Không Tên produced by Phuong Nam Film and Le Quyen who was the main vocal that was held at Gem Center. The liveshow consisted of 22 famous songs of songwriter Vu Thanh An alongside the choreography of dancer Thao Dung. On August 28, 2015, the liveshow was launched at Hoa Binh Theater with the attendance of many guest singers such as Tuan Ngoc, Quang Dung, Ho Trung Dung, 5 Dong Ke band, Ayor Band. Tình Khúc Không Tên was the first liveshow in Vietnam that presenting one kind of music from Vu Thanh An, the ticket was sold out quickly after nearly 2 weeks. Also in the official launch of the liveshow, music booklet Tình Khúc Vũ Thành An was introduced for the very first time which consisted of 39 songs from the songwriter. Hoa Binh Theater was filled with more 2.500 audiences proved that Le Quyen was one of a few singers that could be able to successfully perform Vu Thanh An's songs. In the liveshow, songwriter Nguyen Anh 9 also shared his memories with Vu Thanh An. On December 10, 2015, CD and DVD duo was finally released in the CD fair of Phuong Nam Film.

=== 2016: Le Quyen Live Concert 2016, Le Quyen with Thai Thinh and Phuong Lam ===
In International Women's Day 2016, she held Le Quyen Live Concert at National Conference Center. More than 4,000 tickets was sold out in first week despite high price (from 600,000 Vietnam Dong to 5,000,000 Vietnam Dong) which led her to hold another night of liveshow also in National Conference Center next day (March 9, 2016), however, the ticket was quickly sold out after 2 days. She set the record for being the only singer in Vietnam to hold two nights in a row at National Conference Center with more than 8,000 sold out tickets. The concert lasted until 1am but thousand of audiences still stayed there until the last minutes.

On April 8, 2016, she released the studio album Le Quyen & Thai Thinh titled Còn Trong Kỉ Niệm which included 9 special songs from Thai Thinh, as there were two bolero songs such as Duyên Phận and Đoạn Tuyệt. Although these were Thai Thinh's new creations however without the introduction, the audience often misunderstood that they were old ones as they were based on the vibes from old music style. Duyên Phận was about women from last century who weren't allowed to choose their own partners but their parents arranged the marriage themselves. This was an exciting challenge for Le Quyen to deliver new song based on old rhythm. Although it had been previously performed by Như Quỳnh, however there were lots of differences when it came to Le Quyen's version since it had some similarities with her previous famous songs such as Để Nhớ Một Thời Ta Đã Yêu, Nếu Em Được Chọn Lựa which was performed every night at Không Tên music tea room. Later, Duyên Phận was played everywhere after her performance. Đoạn Tuyệt was the one that Thai Thinh had specially written for Lệ Quyên under the influence of bolero, since many liked it so she bought the unlimited copyright in Vietnam and oversea. She shared: "The album wouldn't be same color as in this one, there were 3 of them: pop, bolero and even pre-war. I have been knowing him for years and also performed many of his songs".

On December 24, 2016, she released a new single from Khúc Tình Xưa series titled Lệ Quyên & Lam Phương. The album included 12 famous songs from Lam Phuong such as: Thành Phố Buồn, Phút Cuối, Biển Tình, Kiếp Nghèo,...During her American tour, she visited Lam Phuong to know that he had known her via television and promised to give her more songs to perform from his collection of 200 unannounced songs.

=== 2017: Bolero Idol, Mua Thu Vang and The Master of Symphony ===
On February 22, 2017, she was confirmed to be one of the coaches for the reality show Bolero Idol second season alongside three famous ballad singers Ngoc Son, Dam Vinh Hung and Quang Le. Throughout 15 episodes of the show, she recruited eight most excellent contestants for her team: Trieu Quan, Mai Huong, Y Linh, Manh Dong, Duc Nham, Hai Yen, Le Mai, Xuan Huong. At the final night on June 16, 2017, one of her team members Trieu Quan was the runner up of Bolero Idol 2017.

On August 11, 2017, she launched the liveshow Mùa Thu Vàng which included creations from three songwriters Lam Phuong, Vu Thanh An and Tran Thien Thanh alongside other guest singers such as Thai Chau, Quang Dung, Quang Le at National Conference Center. More than 4,000 tickets was sold out one week prior to the official liveshow, the organizer had to add more seats due to high demand.

The Master of Symphony was held for the third time in November 10, 11 and 12, 2017 at Hoa Binh Theater alongside the appearance of six famous singers: Le Quyen, Huong Lan, Cam Van, Y Lan, Hong Nhung, Thu Phuong. For the first time, the audience got chance to enjoy collaborations of the singers in the show. Six singers represented six different colors of music that had been with many Vietnamese from around the world who obtained so many beautiful memories to contemporary aliveness. They won over the audience by quality and serious music products over the course of their 20-year career. In 2017, on the stage, they again together contributed timeless songs of Vietnam music.

=== 2018: Le Quyen & Trinh Cong Son; Le Quyen Live Concert 2018 ===
On January 15, 2018, after 20 years of conduction, she finally released the album Lệ Quyên & Trịnh Công Sơn which consisted of 12 masterpieces from the excellent songwriter such as: Ướt Mi, Diễm Xưa, Ru Em Từng Ngón Xuân Nồng, Ru Ta Ngậm Ngùi, Biển Nhớ,.... On the first day, 4,000 copies was sold out although there hadn't been any official statement regarding the album release previously.

On January 18, 2018, and February 6, 2018, she held the liveshow of Trinh Cong Son titled Ru Đời Đi Nhé and both nights of the liveshow's ticket was sold out one week prior. Beside those who wasn't familiar with the new creation, others stated that Le Quyen had her own style of singing which was considered to be unique and emotional. Moreover, Mrs. Trinh Vinh Trinh - younger sister of late songwriter Trinh Cong Son commented that: "Thank you, for a singer who is not specialized in singing Trinh Cong Son's songs but you have greatly presented these songs in a newer way. It was beyond the expectation of the songwriter but also the audience. Personally saying, I really like it. Thank you and also those who had performed my brother's songs previously".

On October 28, 2018, she held Le Quyen Live Concert 2018 at National Conference Center which was edited by herself that included 4 segments: Mùa Thu Hà Nội, Dạ Vũ Nhạc Pháp, Bolero, Remix with the guest appearance of Dam Vinh Hung, Tuan Hung, Quang Dung. The ticket was sold out 20 days prior, and more seats was added due to high demand. This liveshow was the opening for Q Show 2- as 20th anniversary in 2019.

== Charity activity ==
Le Quyen is highly active in Vietnamese charities. She has been launching several charitable concerts titled Tinh Nghe Si. In an effort to support artists living under difficult conditions, she and other colleagues such as Dam Vinh Hung and Quang Linh have been using their voice to raise the fund. As of 2026, the series Tinh Nghe Si has operated for 13 times and raised more than 20 billion Vietnam dong.

=== Tinh Nghe Si 1 ===
Tinh Nghe Si 1 was the first concert that was held at Không Tên music tearoom. Alongside the appearance of many famous singers: Phuong Thanh, Quang Linh, Ly Hai, Quang Le, Le Hieu, Duong Trieu Vu, Hien Thuc, Uyen Linh, Giang Hong Ngoc, Quoc Thien, Bui Anh Tuan and comedians: Hong Nga, Chi Tai, Minh Nhi, Cat Phuong, Tran Thanh, Trường Giang, Dai Nghia, Gia Bao, the hosts were Thanh Van and Anh Khoa. Besides song performance, there were also auctions from the singers which contributed more than 300 million Vietnam Dong for songwriter Nguyen Van Ty (50 million VND), model Duy Nhan and Trang Thanh Xuan (35 million VND) and play actor Long Hai (15 million VND)

=== Tinh Nghe Si 2 ===
After the first concert, she continued to hold another Tinh Nghe Si 2 with the attendance of Dam Vinh Hung, Uyen Linh, Duong Trieu Vu, Hien Thuc, Quang Linh, Giang Hong Ngoc, Gia Bao Comedy Group and raised 310 million VND which later was handed to Hoa My Hanh (40 million VND), the rest was divided to help Tran Dinh Duy, Quach Gia Minh and others.

=== Tinh Nghe Si 3 ===
In Tinh Nghe Si 3, Le Quyen and Dam Vinh Hung with other artists raised 166 million VND. She and Dam Vinh Hung also founded Tinh Nghe Si Foundation in order to help people as soon as possible.

== Reception ==
=== Regarding singing ===
"I will never lipsync", June 20, 2012 - Lệ Quyên

"If you're not able to sing live, don't be a singer", April 9, 2014 - Lệ Quyên

"Those who are self respect never lipsync", April 9, 2014 - Lệ Quyên

"I personally think that my name is still famous enough to sell albums and there's a number of certain audiences who still support me. Everytime a new album is released, they all support me regardless. This is the biggest encouragement for me personally and for other singers generally", April 8, 2014 - Lệ Quyên

=== Regarding awards ===
"I only need the statement "Le Quyen's vibe is irresistible" which is enough for me. To me, that statement is worth million times more than any award or honor ever. My opinion is that as long as I keep singing, there will be audiences, as well as hopefully that I'm able to perform many different genres to widen my number of audiences as much as possible. I could be unlike others, my success is also different from others, however my audiences are divers who are very loyal to my music release, whether it's pop or old music, all of them have already experienced in life in many ways before. Up to now, I have never tried to frame myself into certain mold, because it limits my ability. What will arrive will arrive. What I do is to thoroughly research what I will do to evaluate if I'm capable of it. That's it". November 28, 2013 - Lệ Quyên

"I might not be rewarded any award ever, however I have owned priceless invisible awards which is whenever my name is on the big board, the theater room will be filled up with audiences. I believe that my audiences are those who would like to enjoy real music. At least up to now, I have never dreamed to be reward any award. I don't dare to say that I don't need them, but to confirm that I'm not dreaming of those. Who knows, the day I step on the stage to receive any award, I won't be the same like now". November 28th 2013 - Lệ Quyên

=== Reception from professions and colleagues ===
Many colleagues, artists and songwriters have mentioned her as one of the influencers or as their favorite singer, which including Vu Thanh An, Quoc Bao, Nguyen Ngoc Thien, Truong Ngoc Ninh, Vinh Su, Tuong Van, Tuan Ngoc, Dam Vinh Hung, Bang Kieu, Quang Le, Thu Minh, Ho Ngoc Ha, Huong Tram, Thai Thuy Linh, Mai Huong, Ly Thu Thao, Le Ngoc, Giang Hong Ngoc.

"To me, Le Quyen is the best ballad singer at the moment. She has unique personality and own color in music, it's why I often get nervous whenever having a duet with her", February 18, 2017 - Bằng Kiều

"Le Quyen is a senior whom I really admire as well as being an idol that I would like to achieve in my career. During oversea tours, she spent all night giving me many advice which I really appreciate because not everyone is able to do that. I always memorize her word as being talented is not enough but also along with attitude, treating others equally. Aside her, there're many seniors that I do look up to", July 16, 2018 - Hương Tràm

=== Studio albums ===
Year	Title	Instrument	Notes
2004	Vol. 1 – Giấc mơ có thật	Vĩnh Tâm	Solo
2008	Vol. 2 – Lời yêu còn mãi	Vĩnh Tâm – Tường Văn – Nhất Trung	Solo
2008	Như giấc chiêm bao	Anh Khoa – Tường Văn – Vĩnh Tâm	Duet with Tuấn Hưng
2009	Vol. 3 – Nếu như ngày đó	Tấn Phong – Nhật Tân – Thanh Phương	Solo
2009	Lệ Quyên Acoustic	Lê Thanh Hải – Phạm Viết Thịnh – Lý Huỳnh Long – Dũng Dalat	Solo
2010	Khúc tình xưa	Tấn Phong	Solo
2011	Vol. 4 – Để nhớ một thời ta đã yêu	Vĩnh Tâm – Anh Khoa – Ty Bờm	Solo
2011	Khúc tình xưa 2 – Trả lại thời gian	Vĩnh Tâm – Anh Khoa – Hữu An	Solo
2012	Tình khúc yêu thương	Anh Khoa – Hoài Sa – Vĩnh Tâm	Solo
2013	Vol. 5 – Con tim dại khờ	Vĩnh Tâm – Minh Quân – Vũ Thanh Sơn – Hoàng Nhã – Dương Khắc Linh	Solo
2013	Dòng thời gian (Timeline)	Vĩnh Tâm – Anh Khoa – Hữu An – Minh Quân – Minh Hoàng	Solo
2014	Vùng tóc nhớ (10 songs "no-name" of Vu Thanh An)	Vĩnh Tâm – Minh Quân – Minh Hoàng	Solo
2015	Khúc tình xưa 3 – Đêm tâm sự	Tấn Phong	Solo
2016	Vol. 6 – Lệ Quyên & Thái Thịnh – Còn trong kỷ niệm	Tấn Phong – Vĩnh Tâm – Thanh Sơn	Solo
2016	Khúc tình xưa 4 – Lệ Quyên & Lam Phương		Solo
2018	Lệ Quyên & Trịnh Công Sơn	Hoài Sa – Vĩnh Tâm – Tấn Phong – Minh Quân – Minh Hoàng	Solo
2019	Vol. 7 – Tình khôn nguôi	Hoài Sa – Vĩnh Tâm – Phúc Trường	Solo
2019	Khúc tình xưa 5	Tấn Phong	Duet with examinee at Thần tượng Bolero 2017

== Performances ==
Year	Title	Sponsor	Venues	Notes
Dec-2011	Liveshow "Khúc Tình Xưa 2 – Trả Lại Thời Gian"	Mercedes	Opera House, Ho Chi Minh City,	500 tickets sold out over 15 days
Jun-2012	Liveshow "Tình Khúc Yêu Thương"		Hoa Binh Theatre, Ho Chi Minh City,	2.500 tickets sold out over 15 days
Dec-2013	Liveshow "Q Show" – Happy 15th Anniversary		Hoa Binh Theatre, Ho Chi Minh City and Vietnam National Convention Center Hanoi,	Production cost: 7 billions dong per night ($350.000 as of 2013), 7.500 tickets sold out
Dec-2014	Liveshow "Vũ Thành An & Những Bản tình ca"	VTV	Hoa Binh Theatre, Ho Chi Minh City	2.500 tickets sold out
Jan-2015	Live Tour "Để Nhớ Một Thời Ta Đã Yêu"		Ho Chi Minh City, Nha Trang City, Can Tho City	8.000 attendees per night
Aug-2015	Liveshow Lệ Quyên & Vũ Thành An – "Tình Khúc Không Tên"	Phương Nam Film	Hoa Binh Theatre, Ho Chi Minh City	2.500 tickets sold out
Jan-2016	Liveshow Lệ Quyên & Tuấn Hưng – "Nơi Tình Yêu Bắt Đầu"	VPBank	Sheraton Saigon Hotel, Ho Chi Minh City	
Mar-2016	"Lệ Quyên Live Concert 2016"		Vietnam National Convention Center, Hanoi	8.000 tickets sold out over 10 days
Oct-2016	Liveshow "Duyên Phận"		Star Galaxy, Hanoi	500 tickets sold out
Jan-2017	Liveshow "Khúc Tình Xưa 4 – Lệ Quyên & Lam Phương"		Việt Xô Center, Hanoi	1.000 tickets sold out
Aug-2017	Liveshow "Mùa Thu Vàng" – Lam Phương & Vũ Thành An & Trần Thiện Thanh		Vietnam National Convention Center, Hanoi	4.000 tickets sold out
Jan & Feb-2018	Liveshow "Ru Đời Đi Nhé" – Lệ Quyên & Trịnh Công Sơn		Việt Xô Center, Hanoi	2.000 tickets sold out
Oct-2018	Liveshow "Lệ Quyên 2018"		Vietnam National Convention Center, Hanoi	4.000 tickets sold out
Jan-2019	Liveshow "Tình khôn nguôi"		Hanoi Opera House, Hanoi	1.000 tickets sold out

== Reality television ==
- Chị đẹp đạp gió rẽ sóng

== Awards ==
Years	Awards
2005	Prospect Singer, Lan Song Xanh; Best Song Of The Year – Hãy Trả Lời Em, Lan Song Xanh
2010	Album Of The Year – Khúc Tình Xưa, Zing Music Awards; Best Artist (Top 5 Finally), Zing Music Awards
2013	Artist Of The Year, Zing Music Awards; Artist Of The Year, Tiếp Thị & Gia Đình
2014	Best gold artist (Top 5 Finally), Lan Song Xanh
2015	Best gold artist (Top 5 Finally), Lan Song Xanh
2016	Best Album Of The Year – Còn Trong Kỷ Niệm, Zing Music Awards; Best Song Of The Year – Duyên Phận, Zing Music Awards
