= Khương Hữu Long =

Vietnamese medical doctor

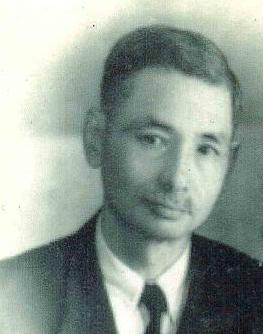

Minister of Health under the Last Emperor of VietNam Bao Dai
- In office 2 June 1946 – 10 November 1946
- Monarch: Bảo Đại

Khương Hữu Long (1890–1983) was a Vietnamese medical doctor for over 70 years, beginning in the 1930s.

== Education ==
Long completed the French "Diplome" (Note: Vietnamese: Thành Chung – thời nầy Việt Nam chưa có bằng Tú Tài cũa Pháp) from Hanoi. He graduated from the only French-established medical school in Vietnam, Hanoi Medical University – Fourth Class of Medicin.

== Family ==
Long was born in Vinh Long in 1890, a direct descendant of an aristocrat Khương Hữu family. His brother Khương Hữu Phi saw the potential in Khương, and gave him $5,000 piastres (at a time when a new car cost $200) to pursue and complete his medical training from Hanoi Medical University. He married Nguyễn Thị Thạch, who came from the ancient city/capital Huế. They had five children, including two adopted from his younger Khương Hữu Lân : Khương Hữu Thị Ngàn, Khương Hữu Cân, Dr. Khương Hữu Hỗ, Khương Hữu Hội, and Khương Hữu Thị Hiệp (wife of physician Hồ Trung Dũng).

== Medical practice and political life ==
After graduating from medical school, he worked for a French Hospital in Vĩnh Long for several years and established his own medical practice. This was the most reputable medical care center in the city at the time.

Subsequently, upon the request of his Majesty Emperor Bao Đai and his colleague, Prime Minister-to-be Nguyễn Văn Thinh Long joined the first Independent Self-Governed Administration (Note: Vietnamese: Cộng Hòa Tự Trị Nam Kỳ) as Minister of Health. After finding out that the French Colonization government was using him to manipulate the Vietnamese people and that the return of independence to Vietnam was part of its calculated move, Thinh hanged himself in protest. Dr. Khương Hữu Long resigned with his colleagues and the government was dissolved.

Long was responsible for teaching leaders in Vietnam such as Trần Ngọc Liễng, Trần Văn Hương, et al. Dr. Khương recommended Ngo Dinh Diem to Cardinal Cushing, who later introduced to him to Dwight D. Eisenhower and Senator John F. Kennedy. This introduction and mentoring led to recognition of Ngo Dinh Diem by the French government and Emperor Bao Dai.

== Life in retirement ==
Long remained a private citizen and practiced medicine until 1970. He died in 1983 at the age of 93.
