= Nhật Sơn =

Vietnamese singer (1981–2013)

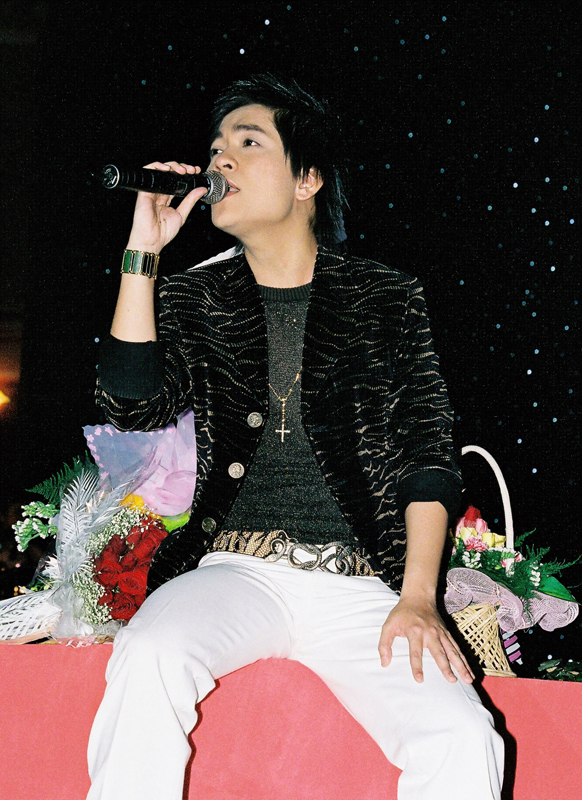
- Nhật Sơn performing live in Ho Chi Minh City (2007)

Background information
- Birth name: Vũ Minh Sơn
- Born: August 29, 1981; Ho Chi Minh City, Vietnam
- Died: September 14, 2013 (aged 32); Ho Chi Minh City, Vietnam
- Genres: Vietnamese pop, R&B
- Occupation: Singer
- Years active: 1987–1996, 2001–2013
- Labels: Phuong Nam Phim, Dong Hai Co., Suoi Mau Co.
- Website: Nhatson.blogspot.com

Vũ Minh Sơn (August 29, 1981 – September 14, 2013) was a Vietnamese singer. He was also the son of singers Minh Cảnh and Kiều My. By the age of six he started performing and singing traditional Vietnamese Cải lương music and Vietnamese pop songs under the stage name Cảnh Sơn. Sơn travelled throughout the country with a group of famous singers and comedians such as Siu Black, Thanh Lam, Quang Linh, Minh Thuận, Duy Ngọc, Duy Phương, Hương Loan, Ngọc Thành and his sister Kiều Nhi, and became well known for performing covers of "Lòng mẹ" (Ngọc Sơn) and "Còn thương rau đắng mọc sau hè" (Bắc Sơn).

At age 14, he stopped singing when his voice started changing. When he was 19, he returned under his new stage name Nhật Sơn and shifted his singing style from traditional to Vietnamese pop music.

At the end of 2006, Sơn recorded his first album Tôi vẫn hát and it was released in January 2007. The composers were Nguyễn Nhất Huy and Hoài An; the arranger Lý Huỳnh Long and producer Winfried Povel from The Netherlands. He performed a special show for the album at Nhà Thi Đấu Nguyễn Du in Ho Chi Minh City. The show was broadcast on TV and was later released on a DVD that included three music videos directed by Đoàn Minh Tuấn and Lâm Lê Dũng.

In January 2008, Sơn released his second album Vết tình. Composers Đỗ Đình Phúc and Lý Huỳnh Long, along with the musicians and producer of his first album, were involved in its creation.

He had been featured in many television shows including Quà tặng trái tim, Gặp Gỡ Ngôi Sao, Saigon Teen, Teen Pop, Thế Giới Âm Nhạc, Trò Chuyện Với Ngôi Sao, Nhịp Cầu Nghệ Sĩ, and Sắc màu V-teen, for National (HTV - VTV) and Regional Television (BTV - DNTV - THVL). He also performed on the big stages of HCMC like Lan Anh, Không Tên and Trống Đồng. In his last years, he performed as Cảnh Sơn and sang traditional Cải lương music along with the singer Bích Hạnh, who, coincindentally, was his aunt.

On September 14, 2013, Sơn was killed out of jealousy by his partner, with whom he had been living together with for one year, in Ho Chi Minh City. After Sơn's death, his producer Winfried Povel worked on the demos for songs from the uncompleted third album Nhớ vô cùng and created videos for them, as a tribute to the singer.

== Albums ==
Tôi vẫn hát CD + DVD (Jan 2007)
1. Tôi vẫn hát (Nhạc: Hoài An, lời: Winfried Povel và Hoài An)
2. Mưa biệt ly (Nhạc sĩ Nguyễn Nhất Huy)
3. Chưa từng cúi đầu (Nhạc sĩ Nguyễn Nhất Huy)
4. Chuyện đời khó nói (Nhạc sĩ Hoài An)
5. Chạy trốn tình yêu (Nhạc sĩ Hoài An)
6. Hãy yêu lại từ đàu (Nhạc sĩ Nguyễn Nhất Huy)
7. Chào ngày mới tươi đẹp (Nhạc sĩ Hoài An)
8. Chốn bình yên (Nhạc sĩ Nguyễn Nhất Huy)
9. Yêu là mơ (Nhạc sĩ Hoài An)
10. Vẫn nợ cuộc đời (Nhạc sĩ Nguyễn Nhất Huy)

Tôi vẫn hát LIVE DVD (Jun 2007)
1. Nhật Sơn: Tôi vẫn hát (Nhạc: NS Hoài An, lời: Winfried Povel, Hoài An)
2. Nhật Sơn: Mưa biệt ly (NS Nguyễn Nhất Huy)
3. Như Ý: Yêu thầm (NS Ni Nguyễn)
4. Nhật Sơn: Chuyện đời khó nói (NS Hoài An)
5. Nhật Sơn: Yêu là mơ (NS Hoài An)
6. Winfried Povel: Thương về Miền Trung (NS Duy Khánh)
7. Nhật Sơn: Chạy trốn tình yêu (NS Hoài An)
8. Như Ý: Một người trong tim (NS Huy Cường)
9. Nhật Sơn: Hãy yêu lại từ đầu (NS Nguyễn Nhất Huy)
10. Duy Phương: Sầu đông (NS Khánh Băng)
11. Nhật Sơn: Chưa từng cúi đầu (NS Nguyễn Nhất Huy)
12. Nhật Sơn: Chốn bình yên (NS Nguyễn Nhất Huy)
13. Winfried Povel: Chân tình (NS Trần Lê Quỳnh)
14. Nhật Sơn: Vẫn nợ cuộc đời (NS Nguyễn Nhất Huy)
15. Nhật Sơn: Chào ngày mới tươi đẹp (NS Hoài An)

Vết tình CD (Jan 2008)
1. Sống trong kỷ niệm (Nhạc: Lý Huỳnh Long, Lời: Đỗ Đình Phúc)
2. Vết tình (Nhạc và lời: Đỗ Đình Phúc)
3. Duyên kiếp (Nhạc và lời: Đỗ Đình Phúc)
4. Khúc hát trên môi (Nhạc và lời: Lý Huỳnh Long - Đỗ Đình Phúc)
5. Lầm (Nhạc và lời: Lý Huỳnh Long - Thái Vi)
6. Đợi chờ (Nhạc và lời: Đỗ Đình Phúc)
7. Còn đó một tình yêu (Nhạc: Lý Huỳnh Long, Lời: Đỗ Đình Phúc)
8. Dấu yêu của tôi (Nhạc và lời: Đỗ Đình Phúc)
9. Một mình tôi với tôi (Nhạc và lời: Đỗ Đình Phúc)
10. Hãy dang rộng vòng tay (Nhạc và lời: Lý Huỳnh Long - Đỗ Đình Phúc)

Nhớ vô cùng (Unfinished 3rd album, 2010 - 2016)
1. Nhớ vô cùng (Nhạc: Lý Huỳnh Long, lời: Đỗ Đình Phúc)
2. Ngày em đi (Nhạc và lời: Đỗ Đình Phúc)
3. Mãi xa (Nhạc và lời: Đỗ Đình Phúc)
4. Bình yên nơi đâu (Nhạc và lời: Đỗ Đình Phúc)
5. Tin trong giấc mơ (Nhạc và lời: Đỗ Đình Phúc)
6. Khúc hat yêu thương (Nhạc và lời: Hoài An)
Bonus track 1. Tôi vẫn hát (Nhạc: Hoài An, lời: Winfried Povel và Hoài An), live in 'Sắc màu V-teen'
Bonus track 2. Sống trong kỷ niệm (Nhạc: Lý Huỳnh Long, Lời: Đỗ Đình Phúc), 'Sắc màu V-teen' wide screen version
Bonus track 3. Nắng Có Còn Xuân (Nhạc và lời: Đức Trí)
Bonus track 4. Mẹ (Nhạc và lời: Phan Long)

== CDs, television shows and video clips ==
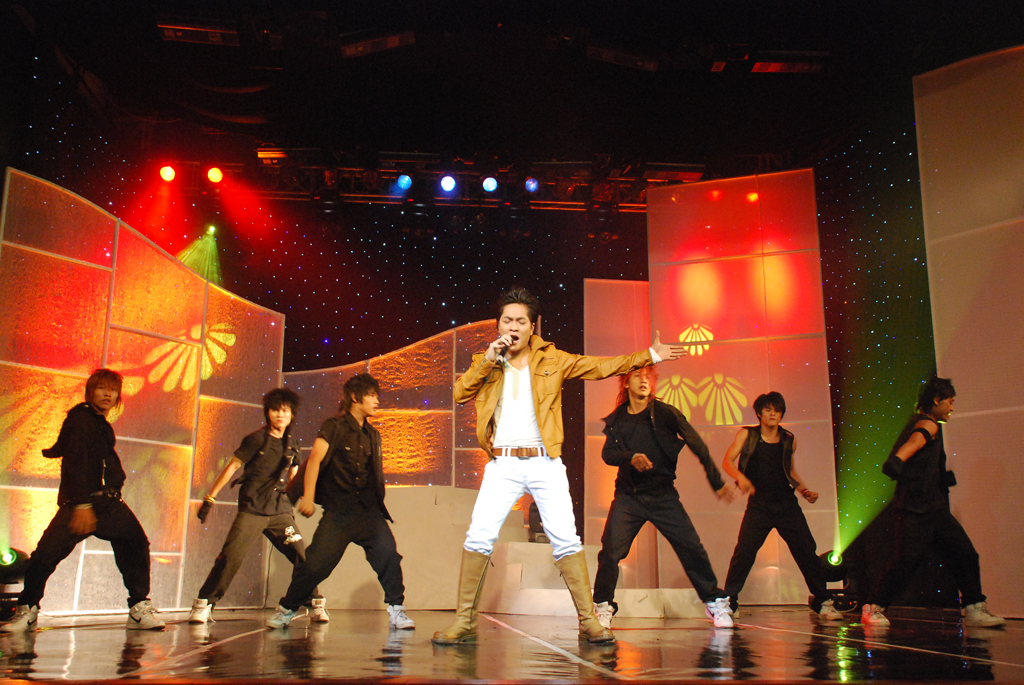
Nhật Sơn & MTE (2008)

- Official Website Ca sĩ Nhật Sơn Nhật Sơn 3 - Nhớ vô cùng
- Tôi vẫn hát, Audio CD1 Audio CD1 - Toi van hat - Nhat Son
- Tôi vẫn hát, 9 Video's Chua tung cui dau (Nguyen Nhat Huy) / Yeu la mo (Hoai An) -
- Tôi vẫn hát Live Show, 12 Parts Nhat Son LIVE SHOW 1 - Toi van hat (Widescreen)
- Tôi vẫn hát Live Show 15 min. REMIX Nhat Son LIVE SHOW 15 minutes (Widescreen)
- Vết tình, Audio CD2 Audio CD2 - Vet tinh - Nhat Son
- Vết tình, 7 Video's Vet tinh Trailer - Ca si Nhat Son
- Nhớ vô cùng, Audio CD3Audio CD3 - Nho vo cung - Nhat Son
- Nhớ vô cùng, 10 Video's 1. Nho vo cung - Nhat Son Videoclip
- Dịu dàng sắc xuân (Video clip Vietnamese New Year 2009) Diu dang sac xuan Video clip - Ca si Nhat Son
