= Trần Trọng Vũ =

Vietnamese painter (born 1964)

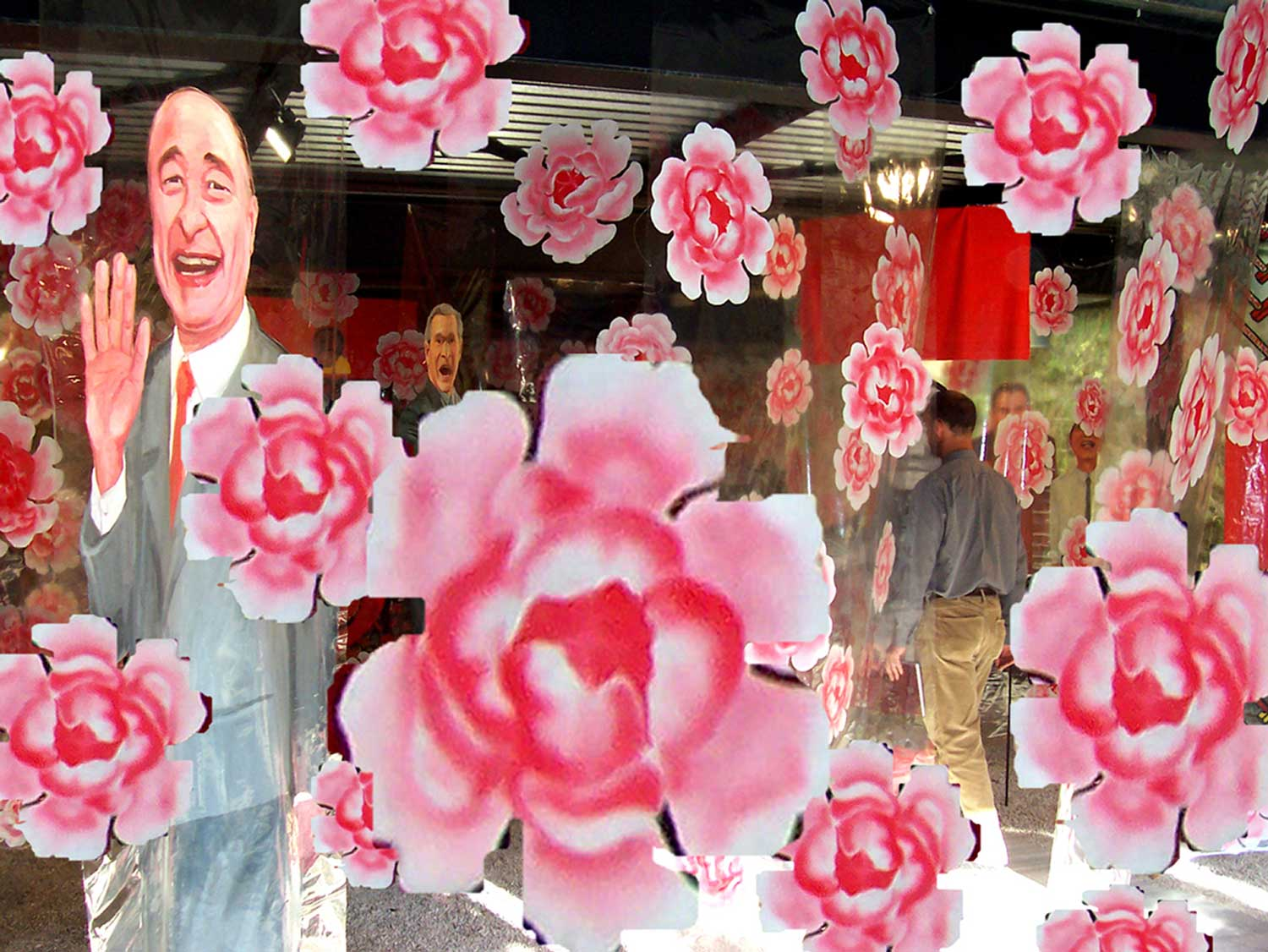
Viva la Politica an installation by Trần Trọng Vũ

Trần Trọng Vũ (born 1964 in Hanoi) is a Vietnamese painter. He is the youngest son of the poet Trần Dần. He is married to Vietnamese writer Thuận.
