= Thuận =

Vietnamese writer

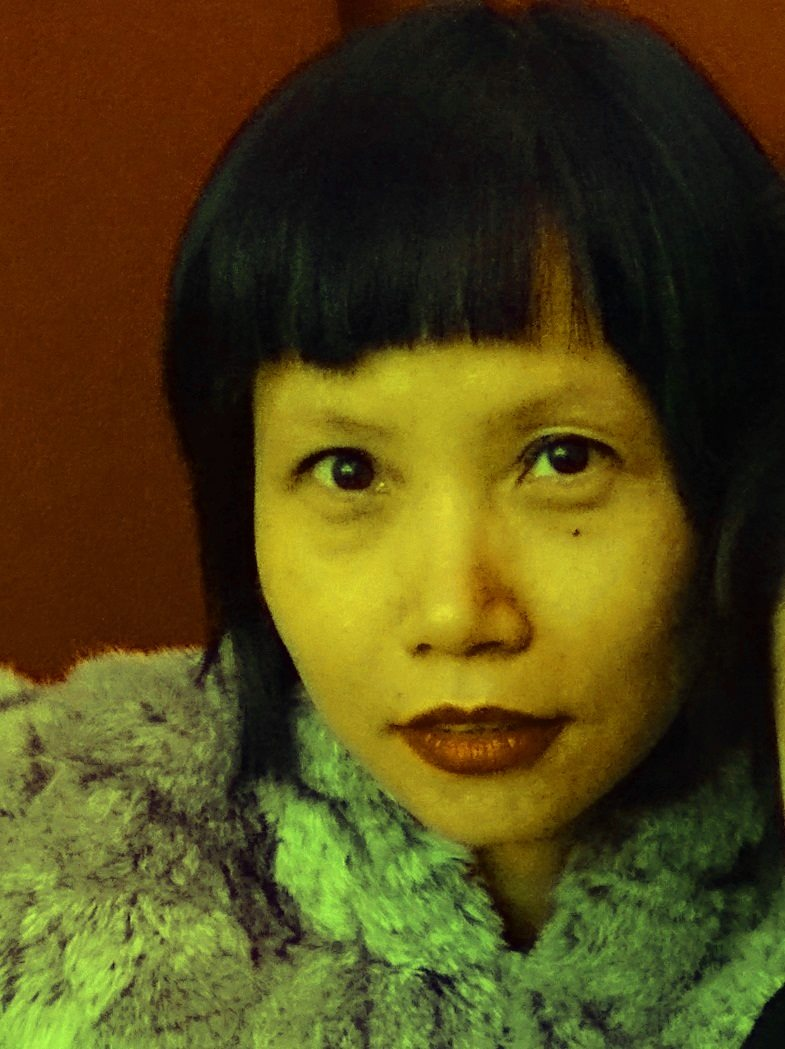
- Thuận, 2016.
- Born: Đoan Ánh Thuận; 1967 (age 58–59); Hưng Yên
- Occupation: author
- Spouse: Trần Trọng Vũ
- Writing career
- Language: Vietnamese, French
- Period: 2002-present
- Notable works: Chinatown (2005), Elevator in Saigon (2013)

Thuận (Đoan Ánh Thuận) is a French writer and translator of Vietnamese origin. Most of her works were written in Vietnamese and translated into French. Her latest novel, B-52 or She Who Loved Tolstoy (2025), was written directly in French.

== Biography ==
Born in Vietnam in 1967, Thuận obtained a scholarship after her baccalaureate to study Russian and English literature in Pyatigorsk, Russia, where she stayed for five years. Arriving in France in 1991, she continued her literary studies at the Sorbonne in Paris. She is the twin sister of academic Đoan Cẩm Thi, professor of Vietnamese literature at INALCO, who has also translated her works into French on several occasions. She is married to Vietnamese artist Trần Trọng Vũ.

Now based in Antony (Hauts-de-Seine), Thuận is the author of ten novels, seven of which have been translated into French and two into English. Her novel A Quiet April in Saigon was banned by Vietnamese censorship in 2015.

She received the Vietnam Writers' Union Award in 2006 and the Centre National du Livre's Creation Grant in 2013 and 2020. Her novel Chinatown, translated into English by Nguyễn An Lý, was the recipient of an English PEN Translates Award and winner of the National Translation Award in Prose 2023 in the United States. It was also a finalist for the Republic of Consciousness Prize 2023 and included in The New Yorker's Best Books of 2022. Her novels are the subject of research in Vietnamese, French, and American universities for her innovative writing style, sometimes unsettling by its humor.

She is also the translator of Jean-Paul Sartre, Patrick Modiano and Michel Houellebecq into Vietnamese.

=== Exile literature ===
Exile is the main theme in Thuận's writing. From one novel to the next, she draws the configuration of the world as it appears since the end of the Cold War, the fall of the French colonial empire, the disappearance of the Soviet Union and the rise of China. As their titles suggest, her novels are notebooks of wanderings – Chinatown, Elevator in Saigon, T Has Disappeared, A Quiet April in Saigon, Paris 11 August, Letters to Mina – in which the reader is transported between Hanoi, Saigon, Paris, Moscow, Beijing, Pyongyang, Seoul, Kabul, Pyatigorsk, Odessa, Chechnya... Her characters usually try to flee Vietnam, their native land, at all costs and by all means.

=== Chinatown ===
An abandoned package is discovered in the Paris Metro: the subway workers suspect it’s a terrorist bomb. A Vietnamese woman sitting nearby, her son asleep on her shoulder, waits and begins to reflect on her life, from her constrained childhood in communist Hanoi, to a long period of study in Leningrad during the Gorbachev period, and finally to the Parisian suburbs where she now teaches English. Through everything runs her passion for Thuy, the father of her son, a writer who lives in Saigon’s Chinatown, and who, with the shadow of the Sino-Vietnamese War falling darkly between them, she has not seen for eleven years.

Besides French, Chinatown was translated into English by Nguyễn An Lý and awarded the National Translation Award in Prose 2023. In their statement, the judges noted: "Who knew reverie could be this fast-moving, this suspenseful? Below the surface, waiting, feeling the uneasy gaze of her fellow Parisians, our narrator travels back through her memories—of her son, of Hanoi, of his absent, longed-for father—and, in so doing, gifts us constraint’s solace: that memories might bring one back to a sense of self, against all the odds."

=== Elevator in Saigon ===
A young Vietnamese woman living in Paris travels back to Saigon for her estranged mother’s funeral. Her brother had recently built a new house in Saigon, including what was rumored to be the first elevator in a private home in the country, but days after moving in, their mother mysteriously fell down the elevator shaft, dying in an instant. After the funeral, the daughter becomes increasingly fascinated with her family’s history and learns of an enigmatic figure, Paul Polotsky, from her mother’s notebook. Like an amateur sleuth, she trails Polotsky through the streets of Paris. Meanwhile, she tries to find clues about her mother’s past, which zigzags through Hanoi, Saigon, Paris, Pyongyang, and Seoul.

Again brought into English by Nguyễn An Lý, Elevator in Saigon was also translated into French, Swedish, and Norwegian.

== Publications ==
=== Novels written in Vietnamese ===
- Made in Vietnam, published by Văn Mới, California, 2002
- Chinatown, Đà Nẵng, Vietnam, 2005
- Paris 11 tháng 8, Nhã Nam, 2005
- T mất tích, Nhã Nam, 2007
- Vân Vy, Nhã Nam, 2008
- Thang máy Sài Gòn, Nhã Nam, 2013
- Chỉ còn 4 ngày là hết tháng 4, Nhã Nam, 2016
- Thư gửi Mina, Phanbook, 2019
- Sậy, Phanbook, 2023.

=== Novel written in French ===
- B-52 ou celle qui aimait Tolstoï, published by Actes Sud, France, 2025.
