= Hồ Trung Dũng =

Hồ Trung Dung
- Occupation: Physician

Hồ Trung Dũng (born 1925) is a Vietnamese former French medical doctor in Vietnam for over 50 years from the 1950s until his retirement at the end of the 20th century.

== Education ==
Dũng's wedding.

He completed the French Baccalauraete; He graduated from the French established Medical School in Saigon – Saigon Medical School Ho Chi Minh City Medicine and Pharmacy University

== Family ==
Dũng's father-in-law was Minister of Health – Dr.Khuong Huu Long under the last monarch Bảo Đại. Dũng is a direct descendant of an aristocrat from city Vĩnh Long, Vietnam. Dũng's wife was Mrs. Khương Hữu Thị Hiệp. from a wealthy and well-established family Khương Hữu. He retired in the United States after the fall of Saigon in 1975 and died in 2002.

== Medical practice ==
Dũng was chief executive officer and president of Từ Dũ, an OB/GYN hospital in Saigon since the 1950s until the fall of Saigon in 1975. During this period he also taught medicine at Saigon Medical School and was its vice-chancellor and dean of academy. He presided, judged, graded, and appointed hundreds/thousands of newly graduated medical doctors in Vietnam. Many Vietnamese-refugee-medical doctors' diplomas (these doctors immigrated to Europe and the US since the fall of Saigon in 1975, have been successfully practicing medicine) have Dũng's signature as "stamp of approval".

== Life in retirement ==
Dũng remained a private citizen and practiced medicine in the United States from 1975 and died in 2002 at the age of 85. His wife died in 2013. They have seven children; 2 have died and 5 reside in the US.
