= Thuy Diep =

American fashion designer

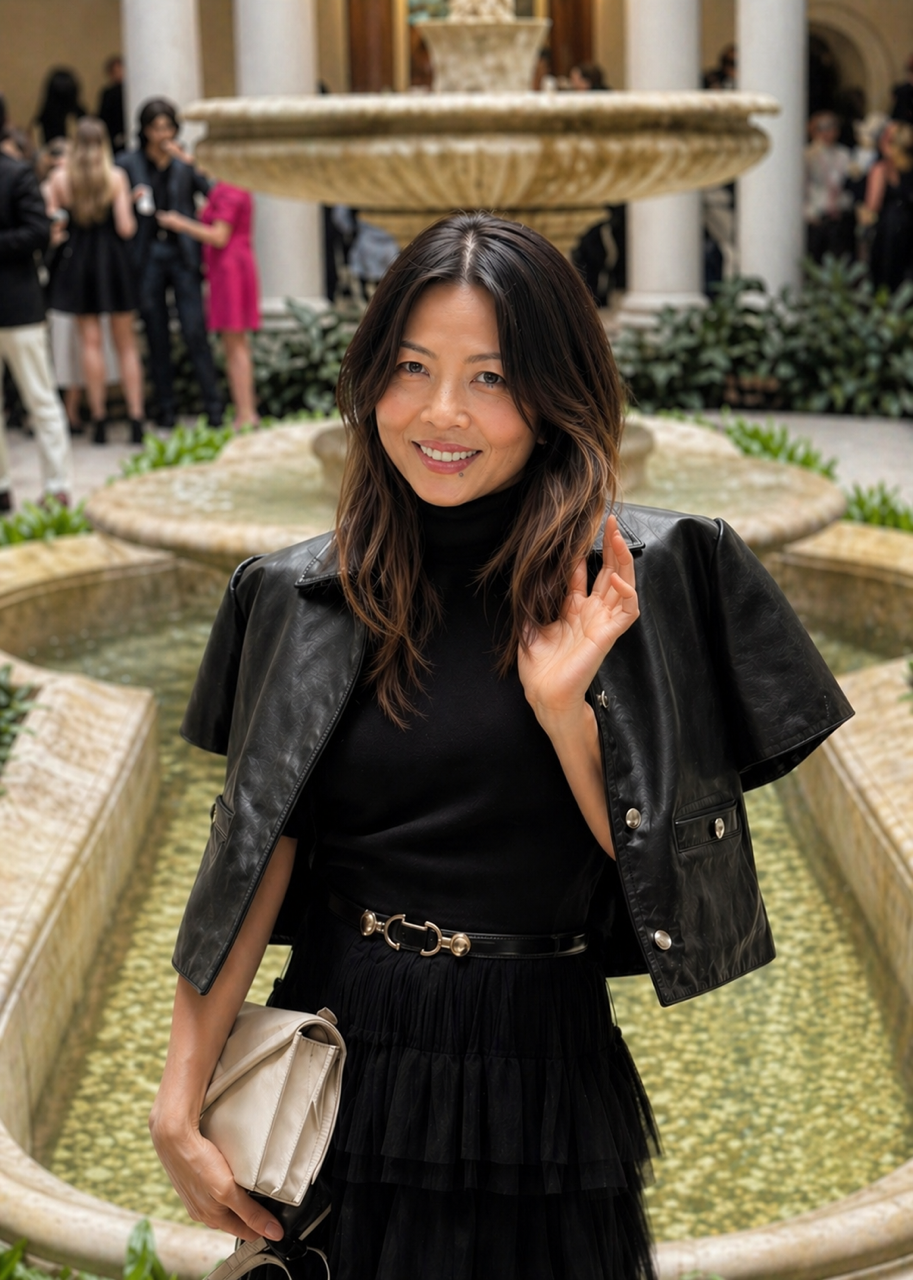
- Born: South Vietnam
- Education: Parsons School of Design; Brown University
- Occupation: Fashion designer
- Years active: 2010–present
- Title: Founder and creative director of the womenswear label THUY; Founder of Little Moony

Thùy Diep is a Vietnamese-American fashion designer and entrepreneur based in New York City. She is known as the founder and creative director of the womenswear label THUY, which presented collections during New York Fashion Week, and as the founder and chief executive officer of the children’s clothing brand and boutique Little Moony.

== Early life and education ==
As a child in South Vietnam, her parents ran a tailoring school and custom-made tailoring business, and Thuy began tailoring at an early age. She moved to the United States in 1981.

Thuy's education was at Brown University, and Parsons School of Design.

== Career ==
Her early professional career as a Pricewaterhouse consultant. After graduating from Parsons, Thuy held diverse jobs in the fashion industry. With Nicolas Caito, a New York City-based Parisian atelier, Thuy provided draping and pattern making services for high-end designers, including Carolina Herrera, Peter Som and Zac Posen.

Following her work at Nicolas Caito, Thuy spent time designing at New York City-based clothing brand, United Bamboo, and working throughout the design process. In 2006, Thuy co-founded her eponymous women's fashion label THUY NYC in New York City.

In 2014, Thuy and her mom, known as ‘Mama Xita’, formed an eco friendly children’s fashion brand called Little Moony. Designed in New York by Thuy, and made in Los Angeles by Mama Xit, the line is season neutral. Little Moony has a boutique store on Mulberry Street in New York City.

=== THUY ===
Diep is the founder and former creative director of the womenswear label THUY, which was active during the late 2000s and early 2010s. The label presented multiple ready-to-wear collections at New York Fashion Week, including Spring 2009, Fall 2008, Spring 2010, Fall 2010, and Spring 2011 seasons. Her runway shows were covered by fashion industry publications such as Women’s Wear Daily (WWD) and New York Magazine, and were included in New York’s Mercedes-Benz Fashion Week programming.

Editorial coverage of THUY also appeared in publications including Seventeen, which documented the presentation of her Spring 2009 collection at New York Fashion Week. Reviews in independent fashion media, including Meniscus Magazine, discussed the design characteristics of her collections, noting the use of structural elements such as zippers as both functional and decorative features.

=== Little Moony ===
Following her work in womenswear, Diep transitioned into children’s fashion and retail with the founding of Little Moony, a New York–based children’s clothing brand and boutique. The business operates with a direct-to-consumer model and maintains a retail presence in New York City.

== Reception ==
Diep’s work has been discussed in fashion and media coverage in relation to both her womenswear label THUY and her later venture Little Moony, Reviews of her runway collections in industry publications such as Women’s Wear Daily (WWD) positioned her within the New York ready-to-wear calendar, noting her structured tailoring and use of contrasting materials and textures. Coverage of her Spring/Summer 2010 collection in Meniscus Magazine highlighted her experimental use of zippers as both functional and decorative elements, emphasizing a balance between construction and visual detail.

Later coverage of Little Moony in lifestyle and retail publications has shifted attention toward her work as an entrepreneur and designer of children’s clothing. Mommy Poppins described the brand as a curated New York boutique offering thoughtfully designed garments, toys, and books, while emphasizing its family-driven production model and use of sustainable materials. The Michelin Guide, in its coverage of shopping in the Nolita and SoHo areas, noted the store as a “charming” and carefully curated retail space, reflecting its positioning within New York’s independent retail landscape. Mentions in hospitality and travel media such as The Knickerbocker have further identified Little Moony as a distinctive destination for children’s apparel and gifts.
