= Hồ Bích Ngọc =

- Born: April 13, 1983 (age 43); Ho Chi Minh City, Vietnam
- Genre: V-pop
- Occupation: Singer-songwriter
- Instrument: Piano
- Years active: 1999–
- Label: CD Baby
- Website: www.hobichngoc.com

Hồ Bích Ngọc (born April 13 1983) is a Vietnamese singer-songwriter and celebrity. She rose to fame in 2003 after winning the Television Voice Contest Tiếng hát Truyền hình HTV.

== Early life and career ==
Ngoc gained first public attention after participating at Unplugged 97, an English language music competition held by the Ho Chi Minh City University of Social Sciences and Humanities addressing young talents age sixteen and above. Only fourteen years old, she participated together with her older sister Van Pham. The team of the two sisters was called Girl and Girl and they participated with a song called Take Me With You, Ngoc singing while Van Pham was accompanying her on the piano. The double came fourth place and received a lot of public attention, not least due to the young age of Ngoc.

In 2000, while a student at Vo Thi Sau Girl High School, Ngoc joined the Television Voice Contest Tiếng hát Truyền hình HTV. She came fourth place and won a prize for the youngest competitor at the contest. After graduating from high school, Ngoc attended the Conservatory of Ho Chi Minh City, and, in 2003, she returned to the Television Voice Contest Tiếng hát Truyền hình HTV Vietnam one more time. This time she left the competition as the winner.

In 2005 Ngoc lost her father, a change that would influence her future life and music.

Saddened over the loss but determined not to give in she published her first album Hòa âm Ánh sáng (English: Harmony of Light) two years later in 2007. The album received very positive echo from experts and Ngoc won an award of Youngest Singer with Best Album in The Gold Album Event in 2007.

In 2009, Ngoc released her second album called Bước kế tiếp (English: The Next Step). Appearance, style and music of this second album expressed modernism and liberalism. As with her first album, Ngoc received a lot of attention and compliments for Buoc Ke Tiep.

The album was followed by the single "Ngày Mới Cho Tình Yêu" in 2011

On 14 February 2016 Ngoc released her third album Ngọc, a compilation of covers of Vietnamese classics.

== Discography ==
Studio albums

2007 Hoa am cua anh sang (English: Harmony of Light)

2009 Buoc ke tiep (English: The next Step)

2016 Ngọc

Singles

2011 Ngay moi cho tinh yeu (English: A New Day for Love)

2013 Mong Mot Lan Thay Anh (English: Some Day We Will Meet Again)

== Awards ==
Year	Award	Category	Organizer	Result
2000	Tiếng hát truyền hình	Youngest competitor of the year	HTV Vietnam	Award
2000	Tiếng hát truyền hình	Solo singer	HTV Vietnam	4th place
2003	Tiếng hát truyền hình	Solo singer	HTV Vietnam	1st place
2007	Chuong Trinh Album Vang	Best album of young singer in genre Pop	HTV Vietnam	Award
2009	Bài hát Việt	Best Pop song of the year	VTV Vietnam	Award

== Television ==
Ho Bich Ngoc has participated as a singer in TV shows such as Thay lời muốn nói, Nhịp cầu âm nhạc by HTV, Bài hát Việt by VTV, and Giai điệu Phương Nam by BTV. She has also appeared as a guest in TV game shows such as CHUNG SỨC.

== Private life ==
Ho Bich Ngoc is married and lives in Binh Thanh District, Ho Chi Minh City, Vietnam.
