= Hoàng Gia Hợp =

South Vietnamese leader (1907–2009)

Deputy Minister of Health of the 1st Republic of Vietnam – Đổng Lý Văn Phòng Bộ Y Tế VNCH – Đệ Nhất Cộng Hòa
- In office 19 June 1960 – 31 October 1963

Chánh Thanh Tra Y Tế
- In office November 1963 – April 1968

Sáng Lập – Viện Trưởng Bệnh Viện Hùng Vương of SouthVietnam
- In office April 1968 – February 1975

Personal details
- Born: 1907
- Died: 7 February 2009 (aged 101–102)

Hoàng Gia Hợp (1907 – 7 February 2009) was a prominent Vietnamese-French medical doctor. He was a pioneering medical professional in Vietnam from the 1930s until his retirement in the 1990s.

== Education ==
Hợp completed the French Baccalaureate II Diploma ranking Excellent, from Paris, France. He graduated from the French established medical school in Hanoi Medical University – First Class of Medical School.

== Family ==
Hợp is a direct descendant and oldest son of Dr. Hoàng Gia Hội, 1st class of Medicin established by the French Government in Hà Nội; an aristocrat family. He was married to Khương Hữu Thị Võ – a wealthy and well-established family Khương Hữuh in ViệtNam, France, and the United States. Hợp was brother-in-law of South ViệtNam High Ranking Navy "Flag Officer" Khuong Huu Ba who held positions of Superintendent of the South Vietnamese Naval Academy and Fourth Coastal Zone Naval Commander & Army Regiment Military Special Zone Commander. Hợp had one daughter Hoàng Thu Thủy who married Doctor Tạ Minh Hiển.

== Medical practice and political life ==
After graduating from medical school, Hợp worked for a French hospital for three years. Subsequently, he established a private hospital in Hà Nội. Upon the division of North and South ViệtNam, Hợp emigrated to the South. His medical practice was well known throughout the country. Hợp assumed the position of Deputy Minister of Department of Health for the First Republic of South ViệtNam. (Note: Vietnamese: trong thời đại nầy miền Nam ViệtNam không có chức vụ Thứ Trưởng – Đổng Lý Văn Phòng cũa Bộ là Thứ Trưởng)

== Founder and CEO of Hùng Vương Hospital I SàiGòn ==
After cabinet member-level position, Dr. Hợp served as chief inspector for the Department of Health for years. During this time, Hợp inspected, coached, and provided guiding directions to many hospitals across South ViệtNam. In this inspection role, Hợp saw the necessity of helping the Vietnamese people to have better access to medical care. On his own and with his own savings, he founded and established Hùng Vương Hospital which later became one of the most prestigious hospitals in South Viet Nam. He continued to seek for private donations and American aid during the ViệtNam conflict to better equip the hospital with all modern medical technologies as well as training Hospital staff. Hợp was instrumental in managing, teaching, and judging many Medical Students Graduating Doctorate Theses. His signature was in many hundreds of Medical Doctor degrees from South VietNam´s only National Medical/Dental school in SàiGòn, ViệtNam.

== Life in retirement ==
After two decades of internal civil war, Vietnam was united between North and South, Hợp emigrated to Canada with his wife Hoàng Khương Hữu Thị Võ. He died on 7 February 2009 at the age of 102 years.

== Quotes ==
- "Medical Profession is to serve and help the poor, the ill, and the unfortunate ones"

== Books ==
- Domen, Arthur (2002). The Indochinese Experience of the French and the Americans: Nationalism and Americans. Indianapolis, Indiana: Indiana University Press. ISBN 978-0253338549.
- Nguyen, Duong (2008). The Tragedy of VietNam War. Honolulu, Hawaii: MFarland. ISBN 978-0786432851.
- Sieg, Kent (2002). Foreign Relations of the United States, 1964–1968, Volume V: Vietnam, 1967. Washington DC: US. State Department. ISBN 978-0160511509.

== See also ==
- List of hospitals in Vietnam
- Hanoi Medical University – French Established Medical School in Hà Nội – Việt Nam
