= Thien LE =

Vietnamese fashion designer (born 1977)

Thien LE (Thiện Lê)
- Born: Thien Minh LE (Thiện Minh Lê); January 5, 1977 (age 49); Vietnam
- Known for: Fashion
- Website: http://www.thienle.com

Thien LE is a Vietnamese-Canadian fashion designer and founder of the Thien Le label specialized in exclusive couture for the individual woman and man. His work goes from golf wear to red carpet couture and has been internationally recognized and featured in several fashion fairs.

== Career ==
In 1996, he attended the International Academy of Design and Technology. During that period, he was commissioned by the Canadian Opera Company to design costumes, that was when Le became known for his attention to detail trademark. After graduating in 1998, Thien Le had explored several avenues of fashion design but only in 1999 he launched his own label which was successfully displayed across Canada turning him into one of the country's premier designers. Over the past decade Le has also worked as a consultant with Bombardier, Miele, Cashmere, Virgin Mobile, Lancome and Elizabeth Arden.

=== Style and collections ===
Thien's work has several influences and sometimes it can be most notable for having a strong influence from what Le calls "The Elegant Period" the 1930s, 1940s and 1950s, as well as the long gowns full of colors and movement which remain his firm signature, tailoring different elements together with details that reaffirm his trademark. One of Thien's darkest collections was the 2002 "A Victorian Captive In Modern Age" collection, composed of black silk and satin that varied from sleeveless to turtleneck pieces, revealing grief and passion. Thien is often solicited for media projects and Fashion shows across Canada and has also become known for channeling his creativity into projects that are out of his comfort zone such as tailoring an entire wardrobe for Canadian band The Abrams Brothers for a specific video where he had to do a lot of research in order to deliver what the band requested. The "Kimono Dragon" was another one of his huge outer ego collections and was shown to a selected audience at the 4 Seasons Hotel in Toronto and later was used to raise money for an orphanage project in Vietnam.
