= Lý Hoàng Sơn =

Vietnamese basketball player

No. 10 – Saigon Heat
- Position: Small forward
- League: ASEAN Basketball League

Personal information
- Born: June 2, 1990 (age 36) Sóc Trăng, Vietnam
- Listed height: 6 ft 0 in (1.83 m)
- Listed weight: 170 lb (77 kg)

Career information
- Playing career: 2012–present

Career history
- 2012–2014: Saigon Heat

Lý Hoàng Sơn (born June 2, 1990) is a Vietnamese professional basketball player who currently plays for the Saigon Heat of the ASEAN Basketball League (ABL).

== Pro career ==
=== Saigon Heat ===
In 2012, Hoàng Sơn joined the Heat before the club's inaugural season in the ABL.
