= Ngô Văn Doanh =

Vietnamese archaeologist, social scientist, and cultural researcher

Ngô Văn Doanh (born 1949) is a Vietnamese archaeologist, social scientist and cultural researcher. He is a professor of the Institute of Southeast Asian Studies of the Vietnamese Institute of Social Sciences, which he joined in 1974, and served as Deputy Director from 1999 until 2006. He has conducted much research into Vietnamese culture, particularly Champa culture in the Central Highlands (Tay Nguyen). In 2002 he published a book, Champa Ancient Towers: Reality and Legend on Champa architecture and legend.
