= Hari Won =

South Korean – Vietnamese singer and actress (born 1985)

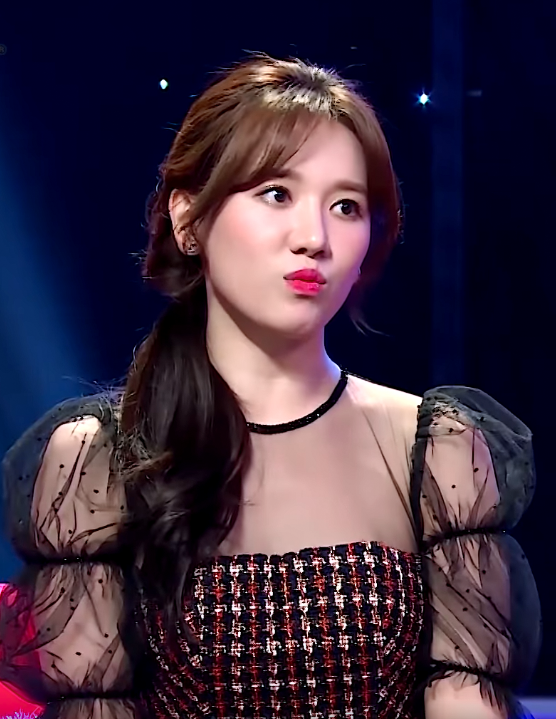
- Hari Won in 2020
- Born: Esther Lưu; June 22, 1985 (age 41); Seoul, South Korea
- Occupations: Singer; Actress; MC
- Years active: 2012–

Signature
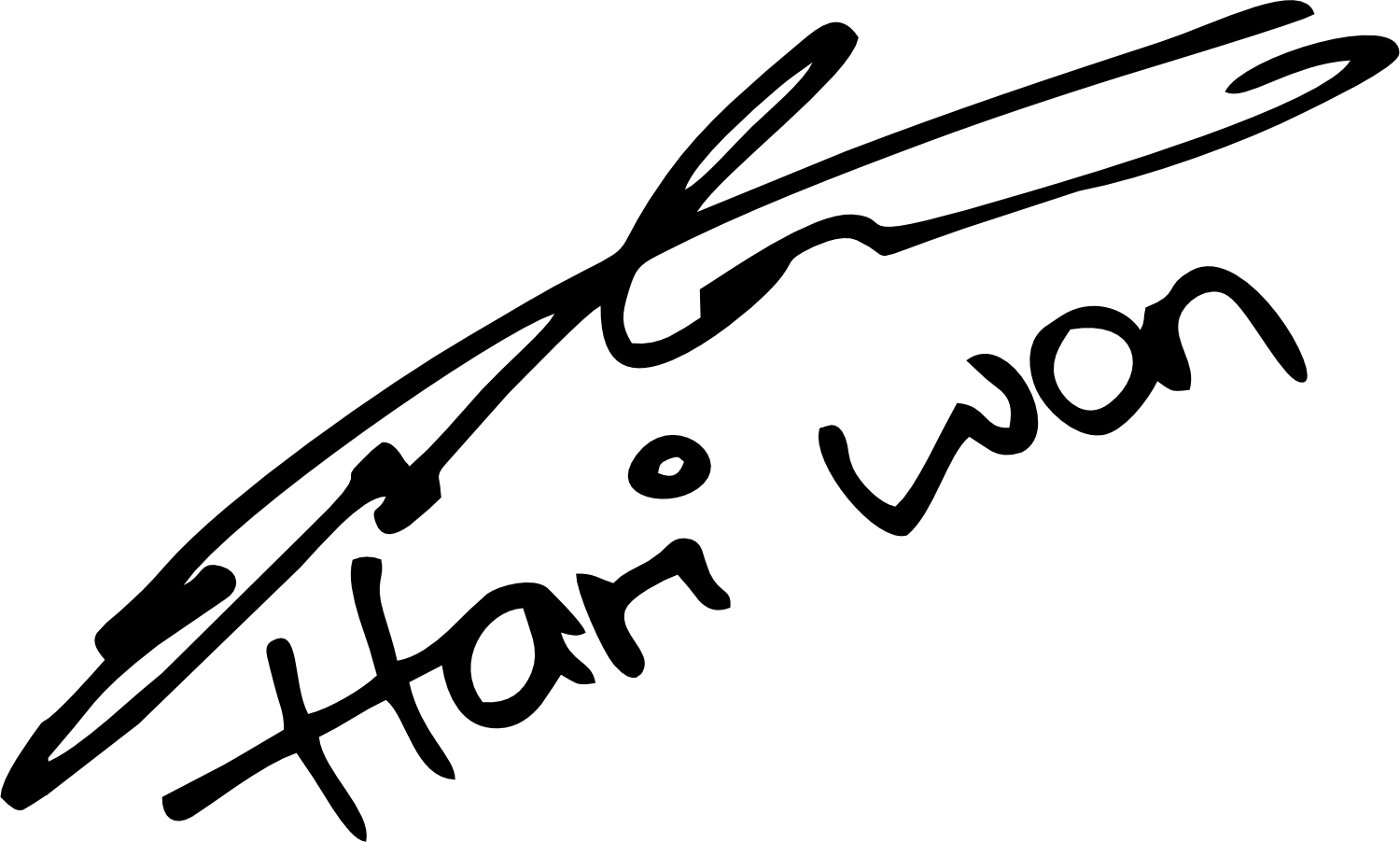

Esther Lưu (Korean: 류에스더; born June 22, 1985), professionally known as Hari Won (하리원), is a South Korean-born Vietnamese singer, actress, and MC in Vietnam. She moved to Vietnam in 2007 to support her father. In 2010, she started learning Vietnamese at Ho Chi Minh City University of Social Science and Humanities. She is living and working in Ho Chi Minh City, Vietnam. Hari is fluent in Vietnamese, Korean, English and is proficient in Japanese.

Hari was one of the contestants on Cuộc đua kỳ thú 2013 (the Vietnamese version of The Amazing Race) alongside her then boyfriend – rapper Đinh Tiến Đạt where she began to gain more fame and popularity.

== Personal life ==
In January 2016, she confirmed to have broken up with rapper Đinh Tiến Đạt after 9 years of dating. In April 2016, she is confirmed to be in a relationship with Vietnamese actor and comedian Trấn Thành. Tran Thanh's father is of Chinese descent from Guangdong and his mother from Tien Giang province in Vietnam, and is proficient in English, Cantonese, Mandarin and Vietnamese. The couple married on December 25, 2016 in Ho Chi Minh City.

During an episode of the program "Chị em chúng mình" aired in November 2020, Hari Won revealed her longing to become a mother. Due to her past struggles with cervical cancer and its increasingly complex progression, she worried that if her condition worsened, it could lead to infertility.

== Songs ==
- Hương Đêm Bay Xa
- Hoa Tuyết – Snow Flower
- Bụi Phấn
- Bài Ca Thịt Nướng
- Jingle Bells
- Aloha
- Mùa Xuân Trở Về (feat. Sơn Ngọc Minh)
- Love You Hate You (feat. Đinh Tiến Đạt)
- Lovely Active Sexy (feat. Hà Lê)
- Honey Honey
- Khóc (Korea version)
- Hạnh Phúc Mới
- Lời Tỏ Tình (feat. Sơn Ngọc Minh)
- Cảm Ơn Cha (feat. Hồ Võ Thanh Thảo)
- Con Gái Có Quyền Điệu
- Anh Cứ Đi Đi
- Yêu Không Hối Hận
- Làm sao để yêu
- Từ giây phút đầu
- Cuối cùng anh cũng đến
- Without You
- Happy Christmas
- Có chăng chỉ là giấc mơ
- Ảo Mộng Tình Yêu (feat. Đan Trường)
- Hoang Phí Xuân Thì (feat. Vương Anh Tú)

== Television programs ==
- Chung Sức – Family Feud (2015 Vietnamese version)
- T-ara Fan Meeting
- Tôi Tỏa Sáng
- Hội Ngộ Danh Hài 2015–2017 (each 2 episodes)
- Tám Ngàn Won
- Ai Cũng Bật Cười
- Siêu Bất Ngờ
- Nhanh Như Chớp
- Là Vợ Phải Thế – Smart Wives (Season 2)
- 7 Nụ Cười Xuân
- Ô Hay Gì Thế Này
- BISTRO K – Quán ăn Hạnh Phúc
- Kỳ Tài Thách Đấu
- Giọng Ca Bí Ẩn
- Biến Hóa Hoàn Hảo – My Name Is... (Judges)
- Quý Ông Đại Chiến
- Khi Chàng Vào Bếp
- 100 Giây Rực Rỡ
- Hành Lý Tình Yêu
- Sao Hỏa Sao Kim
- Siêu Tài Năng Nhí
- Chị Em Chúng Mình
- Running Man Vietnam (season 4) (Guest)
