= Chu Văn Hợp =

(1946–1995) newspaper proprietor and businessman

Chu Văn Hợp (18 July 1947 - 5 June 1995) was a Vietnamese-Australian man who came to Australia via boat in 1978 following the Fall of Saigon. In Australia he saw the need of the growing Vietnamese population in Australia and he started a Vietnamese language newspaper Chuông Sài Gòn (Bell of Saigon) and he was later also an advisor to the New South Wales Government on Ethnic Affairs and a business person with a focus on industry within Vietnam.

== Biography ==
Chu was born in Haiphong, a northern part of Vietnam, and Chu Van Hoa and Nguyen Thi Vy. When he was a young child the family moved to Saigon, now Ho Chi Minh City, and this move was likely motivated by their Catholicism. After completing his studies he was offered a place to study medicine and pharmacy at the University of Saigon and did so for the next year.

After being offered a scholarship Chu instead decided to move to the United States where he studied chemical engineering at Drexel Institute of Technology in Philadelphia. While a student he became disillusioned with south Vietnamese politics and, while not a communist, did not support them. In 1973, following the completion of his studies, he returned to Vietnam and took a role as an executive at Shell.

In 1975, following the Fall of Saigon Hop was sent to an agricultural re-education centre where he was made a labourer until able to escape about a year later.

On 10 April 1976 Chu married Le Thi Kiem and, soon after, they had a son. In 1978 the young family decided to seek refugee status in Australia and travelled to Darwin via boat. They landed in May 1978 and, soon after, settled in Perth. In taking this action they became what is colloquially known as Vietnamese boat people.

In Australia they became part of a growing population of around 50,000 Vietnamese people living in Australia. Chu soon realised that this new community needed more print resources and that, rather than the cultural maintenance available in other publication, news and information was the most important. With this in mind, and having consulted numerous members of the Vietnamese community, he started Australia's first Vietnamese language newspaper in 1979. It was named Chuông Sài Gòn (Bell of Saigon) and they name was chosen to show his support of freedom and, more specifically, freedom of religion, as well as their anti-communist stance. The newspaper was edited by Chu and contained news articles as well as short stories, poetry, people's life stories and commentary by Chu. It was initially published fortnightly but was soon published weekly and, never been financially beneficial, Chu sold it in 1982.

After selling the paper Chu became a clerk for the Department of Immigration and Ethnic Affairs in their Sydney office and, three years later in 1985, was promoted to being the director of their 'ethnic affairs' section. In 1987 Chu was also made a special advisor to Barrie Unsworth, the then Premier of New South Wales with whom he was a friend.

In 1988 Chu entered business again and started a business to help Vietnamese migrants, in both Australia and the United States, to send money to their families in Vietnam. He also later established a consultancy business, Vietnam Business Specialists, which focuses on investments within Vietnam. In support of this he published a Guide to Doing Business in Vietnam (1991).

He died on 5 June 1995 while on a business trip and holiday in the United States in a canoeing accident in the Illinois River in Oklahoma alongside his son. His body was returned to Australia and he is buried in Rookwood Cemetery.
