= Ngọc Sơn (singer) =

Vietnamese singer

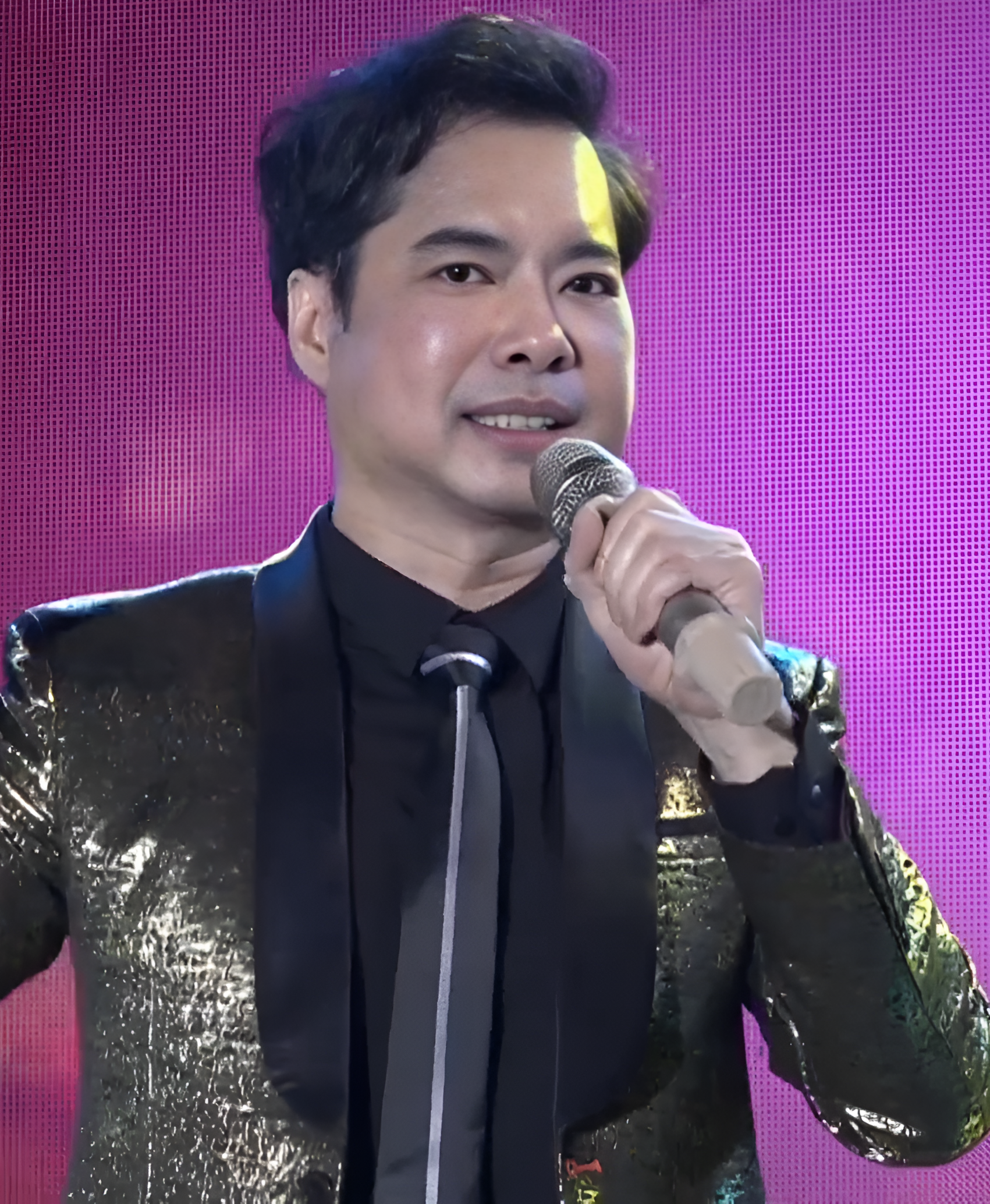
- Ngọc Sơn in 2017

Background information
- Born: Phạm Ngọc Sơn; November 26, 1968 (age 57)
- Years active: 1989–present
- Website: ngocson.com

Ngọc Sơn (born November 26, 1968) is a Vietnamese singer and songwriter. He is known by the nicknames "King of Sến Music" or "Michael Ngọc Sơn."

== Life ==
Ngọc Sơn was born in Đồ Sơn, Hai Phong, Vietnam, hometown of his mother. He is origin from Quảng Nam, his father origin. His mother with Ngoc Hai and Ngoc Ha, two of his brothers, Ngọc Sơn has conducted many music programs. His music ranges from ethnic songs to other genres such as pop, rap, and rock.

Ngọc Sơn was awarded the Voice of the Western Provinces in 1985, Affectionate Singer of 1989 in Nha Trang, and, for his Ngọc Sơn Pop CD 1, the Winners Gold Record in 1997.
