= SofM =

Vietnam League of Legends player

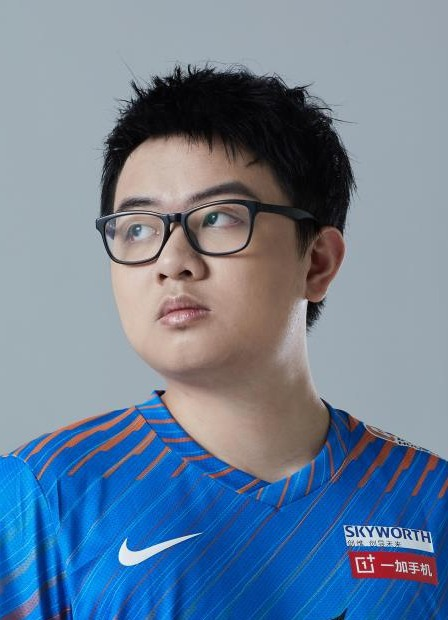
- SofM in 2021

Personal information
- Name: Lê Quang Duy
- Born: February 5, 1998 (age 28); Cầu Giấy, Hanoi, Vietnam
- Nationality: Vietnamese

Current team
- Team: N/A
- Role: Jungler
- Game: League of Legends
- League: N/A

Team history
- 2012–2013: GameTV
- 2013–2016: Full Louis
- 2017–2019: LNG Esports (Note: Known as Snake Esports until middle 2019.)
- 2020–2022: Weibo Gaming (Note: Known as Suning until late 2021.)

Lê Quang Duy (born February 5, 1998), better known as SofM (short for Style of Me), is a Vietnamese professional League of Legends and previous player for Weibo Gaming.

SofM is widely known in the Vietnamese League of Legends community for his skills, tactics, and unique playstyle. He is regarded as one of Vietnam's best esports players in League of Legends. He had played at Jungler role for Suning and reached to the 2020 League of Legends World Championship finals, but lost to DAMWON Gaming.
