= Chinese songs with Vietnamese lyrics =

Vietnamese practice of writing new Vietnamese lyrics to Chinese pop melodies

- Stylistic origins: Mandopop, Cantopop, C-pop, Yellow music
- Cultural origins: Overseas Vietnamese communities; Vietnam

Other topics
- Foreign songs with Vietnamese lyrics, Contrafactum, Copyright, Derivative work, Song translation

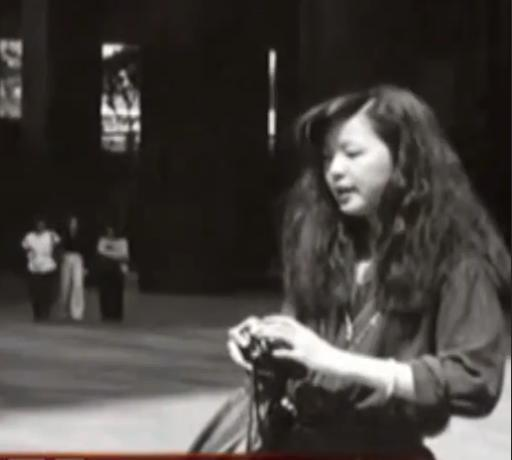
Teresa Teng, one of the Chinese-language artists whose songs were later adapted into Vietnamese lyrics and circulated widely among overseas Vietnamese audiences.

Chinese songs with Vietnamese lyrics (nhạc Hoa lời Việt, lit. "Chinese music with Vietnamese lyrics") are Vietnamese-language songs written to melodies or backing tracks from Chinese-language popular music, especially Mandopop and Cantopop associated with mainland China, Taiwan, and Hong Kong. They circulate in Vietnam and among overseas Vietnamese communities.

Vietnamese lyric versions range from close translation to new lyric sets written to an existing tune. The practice has roots before 1975; it expanded after 1975 in overseas communities (especially in the 1980s), entered Vietnam's commercial market in the 1990s and early 2000s, and gained new visibility from the late 2010s through platform-driven cycles of cover versions. Commercial releases and online circulation have fueled disputes over derivative works, licensing, and rights management, particularly on digital platforms where cover recordings spread quickly.

== Terminology and characteristics ==
In Vietnamese, đặt lời ("to set/write lyrics") refers to crafting singable lyrics for an existing melody and does not require line-by-line semantic fidelity to a source text. Lyric adaptation spans closer translation, paraphrase/adaptation, and full rewriting, shaped by syllable count, stress placement, rhyme, and performance style.

A 2025 analysis of 15 Vietnamese lyric versions grouped strategies into three types: meaning-oriented translation, paraphrase/adaptation, and free rewriting (creative recreation). Paraphrase/adaptation appears most frequently (8/15), followed by free rewriting (4/15) and meaning-oriented translation (3/15). In cover contexts, some recordings prioritize semantic content over strict singability.

Common approaches include keeping lines relatively intact, rewriting around an overall storyline, or writing entirely new lyrics to the same tune. To preserve melody and rhythm, writers balance syllable counts and stress points through reordering, inserting or removing filler words, and adjusting rhyme to fit the meter. In 999 đóa hồng, the Vietnamese lyrics closely track syllabic timing and frequently end lines with vowel sounds to sustain resonance along the melodic line.

Vietnamese versions may be released with new arrangements, tempo changes, or added sections (for example, rap segments). The format also includes shifts in imagery relative to source texts, bilingual performances that retain parts of the original (for example, Cantonese), and multi-step adaptation chains in which a melody had already been adapted from Western, Japanese, or Korean songs before receiving Vietnamese lyrics.

== History ==
The practice emerged from cross-border flows of East Asian popular music consumption among Vietnamese audiences and expanded after 1975 through production and distribution networks in overseas Vietnamese communities. Between 1979 and 1995, it developed in two phases, 1979–1985 and 1986–1995. Stylistic shifts followed in the mid-1990s amid transnational exchange.

=== Background before 1975 ===
Popular music from Hong Kong and Taiwan circulated widely in South Vietnam in the 1960s and 1970s, and Vietnamese lyricists adapted Chinese-language songs within the commercial music space of the Republic of Vietnam period. Mùa thu lá bay was adapted from Teresa Teng's A Thousand Words, with Vietnamese lyrics credited in some accounts to Nam Lộc. The same melody circulated with multiple Vietnamese-lyric titles (including Mùa thu lá bay and Một ngày sống bên em), and sources differ on lyric authorship.

=== Formation and circulation in overseas communities ===
After 1975, Chinese-melody Vietnamese-lyrics songs expanded in Vietnamese refugee communities overseas, especially in Little Saigon (Orange County, California). The repertoire spread through informal networks tied to cassettes and videotapes, with links to Hong Kong and US video markets. Chinese-language film and television music, particularly wuxia television themes in Cantonese, supplied a large pool of melodies accessed through home video rental and tape networks in the 1980s. In 1986, Dạ Lan Productions in Santa Ana, California released a compilation of Vietnamese-lyric adaptations drawn from Chinese-language television soundtracks. Many of the selections came from wuxia series based on novels by Jin Yong.

From 1986 to 1995, productions tended toward slow ballad arrangements and female solo vocals, often with string sections and occasional incorporation of traditional instruments. Recordings clustered around exile themes—displacement, separation, loss—and romantic love songs, including tracks that retained Cantonese chorus sections for bilingual effects.

=== Popularization and commercialization in Vietnam ===
In the 1990s, cassette and video markets, expanding karaoke culture, and the popularity of Hong Kong and mainland Chinese television dramas helped spread the format in Vietnam. Performers associated with the period include overseas singers such as Ngọc Lan (ca sĩ), Lưu Bích, Tô Chấn Phong, and Jimmii Nguyễn, and domestic singers such as Sỹ Ben, Cảnh Hàn, Minh Thuận-Nhật Hào, Lam Trường, Đan Trường, and Cẩm Ly. Television dramas linked to 1990s popularity include Justice Bao and My Fair Princess.

In the early 2000s, a single melody could circulate with multiple Vietnamese lyric sets, including cases linked to exclusive licensing for album releases. Compilation-style video programs that mixed songs with skits and introduced new singers were part of the early-1990s market and were branded around sentimental popular styles and "Chinese songs with Vietnamese lyrics".

=== Decline and re-emergence on digital platforms ===
The commercial boom eased in the mid-2000s. Vietnam joined the Berne Convention in October 2004, which coincided with tighter commercial constraints on unlicensed use of foreign melodies. In the early 2000s, some domestic producers sought permissions for releases through intermediaries in Taiwan.

Since the late 2010s, the format has re-emerged in waves on digital platforms, often driven by user-generated content and short-form sharing dynamics. A 2019 wave around Độ ta không độ nàng brought takedowns and licensing disputes. Waves in 2020–2021 included rapid rises on online charts alongside multiple cover versions and different Vietnamese lyric sets built on the same melody, including new arrangements and added rap segments in some releases.

Re-recordings and "refresh" projects for earlier Chinese-melody Vietnamese-lyrics songs include releases by Nguyễn Hồng Ân and Đan Trường.

== Reception ==
For many listeners, Chinese songs with Vietnamese lyrics evoke 1990s popular culture, tied to cassettes, karaoke, and the consumption of Hong Kong and mainland Chinese television dramas. The appeal has also been linked to melodic and scale characteristics described as familiar to Vietnamese listeners. Debates have framed the format as a market strategy and raised questions about creativity and musical identity. On digital platforms, disputes have focused on the line between a refresh, a translation, and a copy when multiple covers and lyric versions circulate on the same melody.

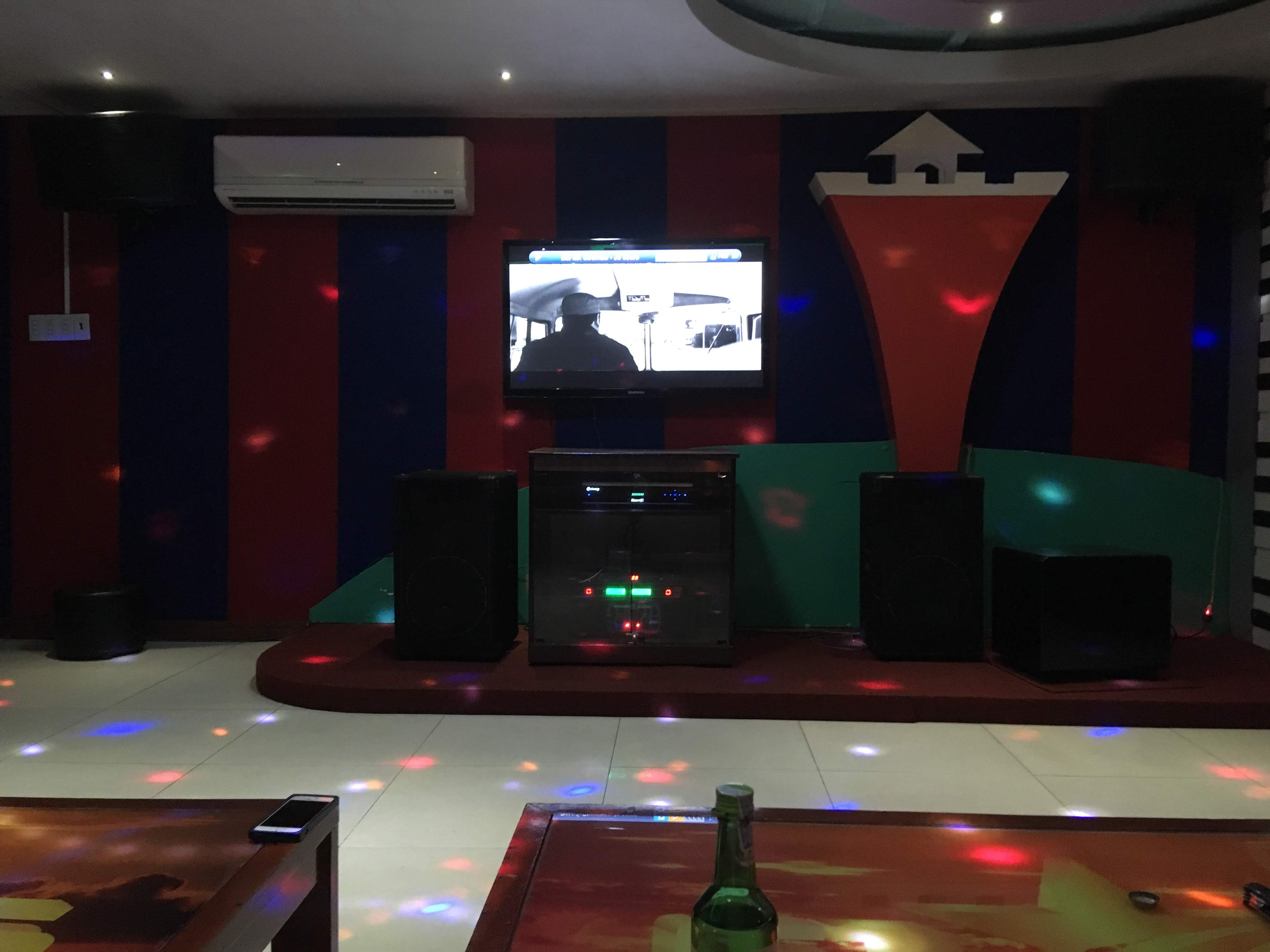
A karaoke room in Nha Trang.

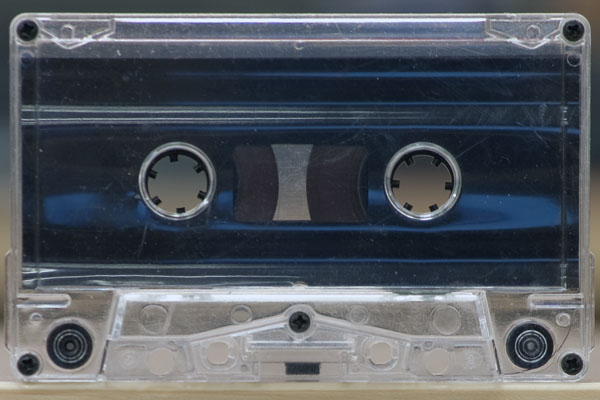
Compact cassette tapes were a common distribution format in late-20th-century Vietnamese popular music markets.

== Notable lyricists and performers ==
Lyricists associated with the format include Nam Lộc, Chu Minh Ký, Nhật Ngân, Lữ Liên, and Khúc Lan. Chu Minh Ky is credited with writing Vietnamese lyrics for more than 200 Chinese-melody songs. Many of his Vietnamese-lyric version were very popular in Vietnam during the 1990s, including Lam Trường's 1998 album Mãi Mãi. Rather than aiming for a strict or line-by-line translation, lyricists often prioritized singability and emotional fit first; some versions rewrote or added lines to better match a singer's delivery and audience taste at the time.

Performers closely associated with the trend include Minh Thuận-Nhật Hào, Lam Trường, Đan Trường, and Ưng Hoàng Phúc.

== Examples ==
Examples include:

- Mùa thu lá bay (from Thiên ngôn vạn ngữ).
- 999 đóa hồng (from 九百九十九朵玫瑰).
- Độ ta không độ nàng (渡我不渡她).

Other widely circulated examples in the 1990s include songs known in Vietnamese as Phi trường, Hải âu phi xứ, and Ánh trăng nói hộ lòng tôi. Multi-step adaptation chains include Người tình mùa đông associated with a Chinese version performed by Faye Wong and later Vietnamese recordings by Như Quỳnh.

== Copyright and controversies ==
Commercial exploitation of Vietnamese lyrics written to existing Chinese melodies has raised debates about derivative works, licensing, and rights management, especially on digital platforms where covers can proliferate rapidly. The 2019 wave around Độ ta không độ nàng involved takedowns and disputes over authorized representation for Chinese rights holders, alongside continued circulation via licensed or revenue-sharing arrangements.

== See also ==
- C-pop
- Mandopop
- Cantopop
- Yellow music
- Vietnamese music
- Translated songs (Japanese)
