= Dana Mohler-Faria =

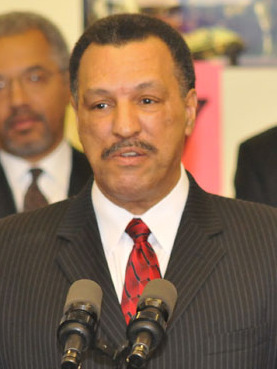
- Mohler-Faria in 2008

President of Bridgewater State University
- In office 2002–2015
- Preceded by: Adrian Tinsley
- Succeeded by: Frederick W. Clark

Massachusetts Special Advisor for Education
- In office January 4, 2007 – March 11, 2008
- Governor: Deval Patrick
- Preceded by: office established
- Succeeded by: office abolished

Personal details
- Education: Cape Cod Community College (associate); Boston University (BA, MA); University of Massachusetts Amherst (Ed.D.)

Dana Mohler-Faria was the eleventh president of Bridgewater State University serving from 2002 until his retirement in 2015, and a member of the Massachusetts Board of Elementary and Secondary Education. He was formerly the Special Advisor for Education to Massachusetts Governor Deval Patrick prior to the creation of a cabinet-level Secretary of Education in 2008.

== Personal life ==
Mohler-Faria received an Associate's degree from Cape Cod Community College, a bachelor’s and Master's degree in history from Boston University, and a Doctor of Education degree higher education administration from the University of Massachusetts Amherst. He is a veteran of the United States Air Force, serving from 1966 to 1970. He currently resides with his wife and son in Mashpee, Massachusetts

== Professional life ==
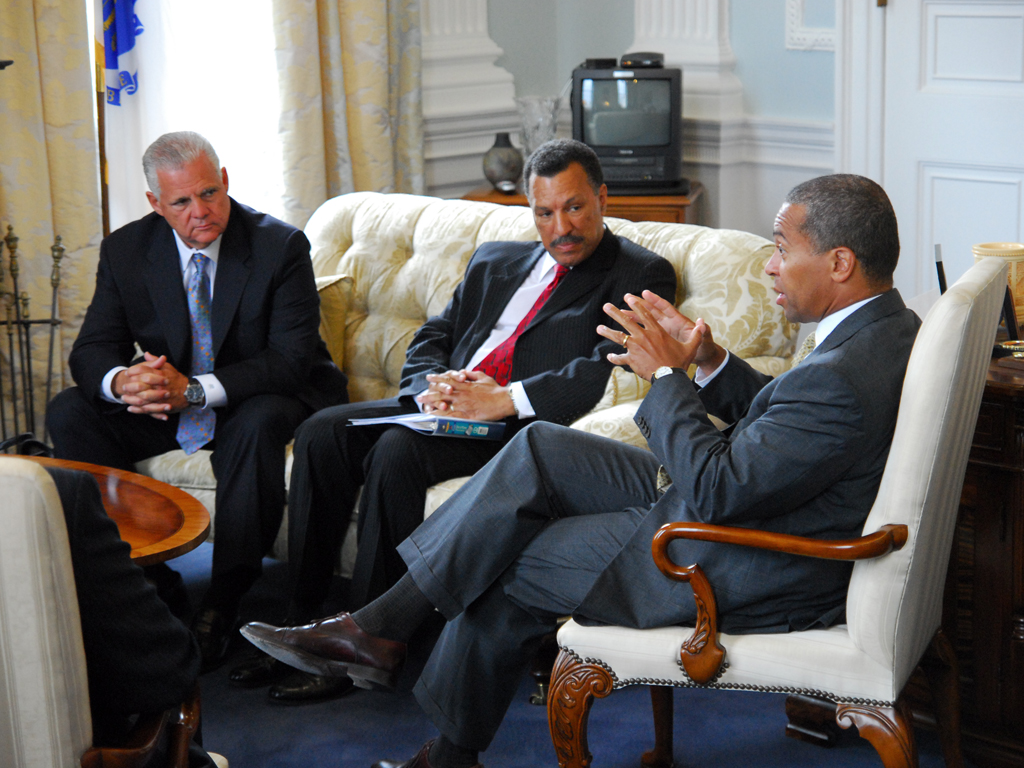
L-R: Businessman Joseph M. Tucci, Mohler-Fairi, and Governor Deval Patrick in 2007

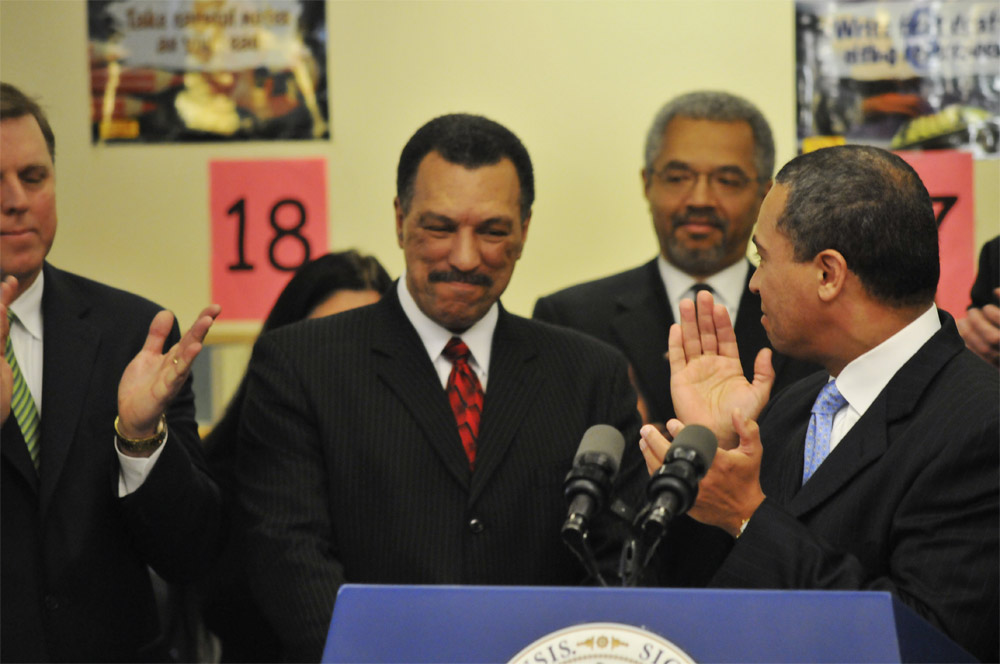
Mohler-Faira (center) in 2008 with Governor Deval Patrick (far right) and other officials

From 1975 to 1984, Mohler-Faria was Director of Financial Aid and the SACHEM Outreach Program at Cape Cod Community College. Following that post, he served as Assistant Dean of Administrative Services at Bristol Community College until 1987, and then in various leadership positions at Mount Wachusett Community College until 1991. In 1991 he began his association with Bridgewater State College, serving eleven years as the Vice President for Administration and Finance. In 2002, he succeeded Adrian Tinsley as President of Bridgewater State College. He stepped down at the end of the 2014-2015 academic year.

Upon retiring from his role as President, Dana Mohler-Faria caused controversy with his retirement payout, and the Massachusetts state auditor met with Bridgewater State officials due to it. Mohler-Faria followed Massachusetts Board of Higher Education policies, which allowed for departing higher education faculty members to be paid the full value of up to 64 days of unused vacation time, with any further unused vacation time being cashed out at twenty percent of its original value. However, the validity of his unused vacation time was called into question by the public, as the last three years of his tenure saw Mohler-Faria take 29 national and international trips to destinations such as Cape Verde, Belize, and Las Vegas. The trustees of Bridgewater State claimed all of these trips were used to raise money or "boost awareness" for the university. Ultimately, this controversy led then Massachusetts Governor Baker to push for legislation to limit the accrual of unused vacation time as well as sick time by state workers.

According to his biographical sketch on the Commonwealth of Massachusetts' website, Mohler-Faria, in ascending to the presidency of Bridgewater State University, became the "first person of color to lead Bridgewater State College and is only the second Cape Verdean in the United States to be elected the president of a higher education institution."

He is currently a member of the advisory council for the Wampanoag Language Immersion School, a partnership between the Wôpanâak Language Reclamation Project and the Montessori Academy of Cape Cod.

Academic offices
Preceded by Adrian Tinsley	President of Bridgewater State University; 2002 - 2015	Succeeded by Frederick W. Clark
Government offices
Preceded by New Office	Massachusetts Special Advisor for Education; January 4, 2007 - March 11, 2008	Succeeded by Office Abolished
