= Cape Cod Community College =

Public college in West Barnstable, Massachusetts, US

Coordinates: 41°41′29″N 70°20′14″W

- Seal of Cape Cod Community College
- Other name: "4Cs"
- Motto: Powerful Futures Start Here
- Type: Public community college
- Established: 1961
- Accreditation: NECHE
- President: Ellen Kennedy
- Administrative staff: approx. 68 full time faculty, 582 full & part-time staff
- Students: 6,500+ credit seeking annually, 5000+/- non-credit seeking annually
- Postgraduates: approx. 500 students annually in advanced degree programs offered on campus by public and private 4-yr institutions that partner with the College.
- Location: West Barnstable, Massachusetts, U.S.
- Campus: Suburban / commuter
- Mascot: Sharks
- Website: www.capecod.edu

Cape Cod Community College, known locally as "4Cs", is a public community college in West Barnstable, Massachusetts. It was established in 1961, the second institution to open as part of what is now a 15 community college system in Massachusetts. Cape Cod Community College is the only community college and one of three colleges, along with Massachusetts Maritime Academy (Mass Maritime) in Buzzards Bay, Massachusetts and Bridgewater State University's Cape Cod satellite campus, on Cape Cod. It awards Associate in Arts and Associate in Science degrees and various academic certificates in a wide variety of programs. The college offers access to on-campus bachelor's and master's degree programs in partnership with: Bridgewater State University, Boston University, Lesley University, Salem State University, Suffolk University, UMass Boston, and UMass Dartmouth. Cape Cod Community College formally had a partnership with Wheelock College before that merged with Boston University to become the Boston University Wheelock College of Education & Human Development on Boston University's Fenway Campus. Cape Cod Community College is accredited by the New England Commission of Higher Education.

The college is home to the Lyndon P. Lorusso Applied Technology Building, a Leadership in Energy and Environmental Design certified facility completed in 2006.

== Notable alumni ==
- Dana Mohler-Faria, president, Bridgewater State College
