= Minh Tuyết =

Vietnamese-American singer

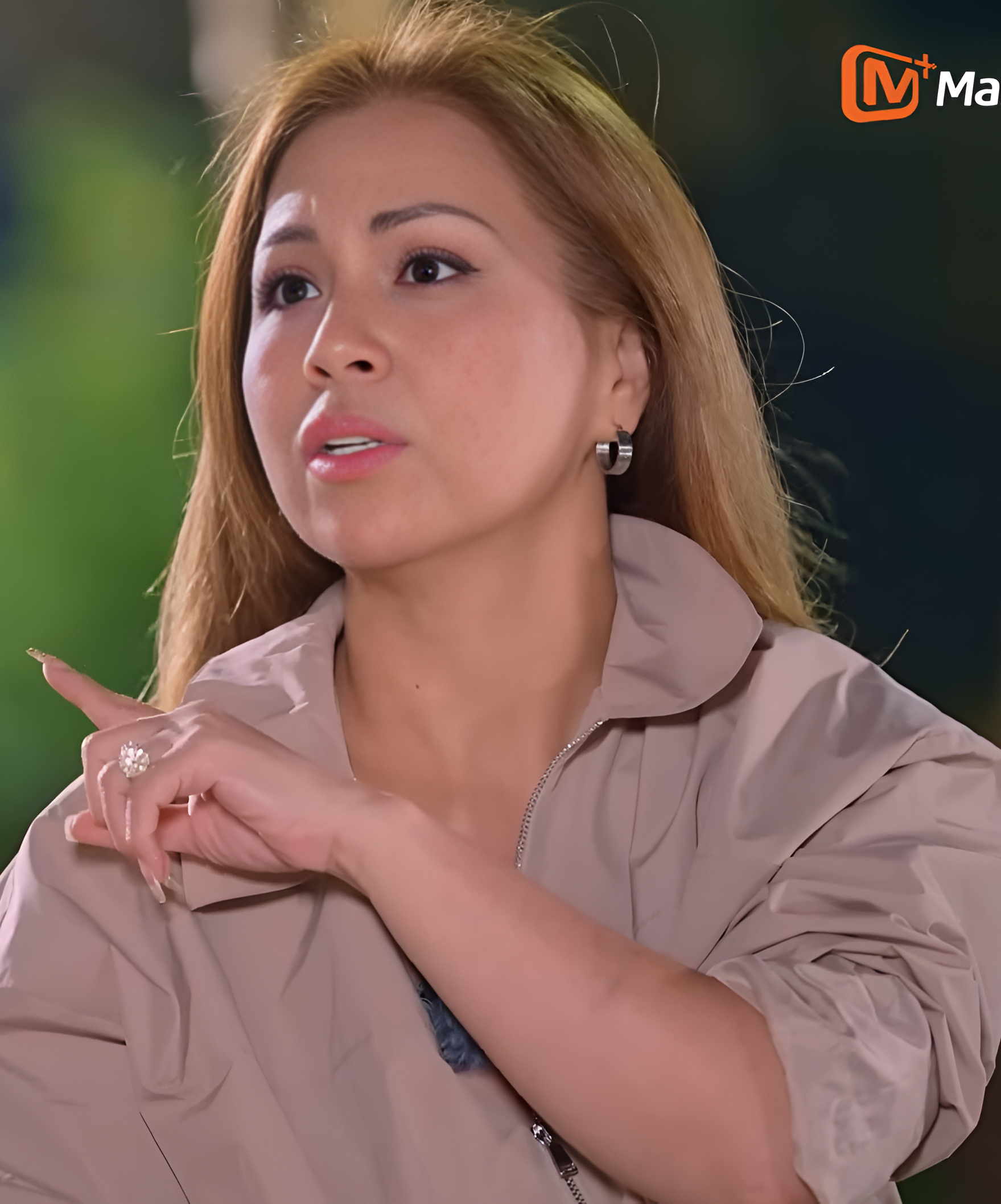
- Minh Tuyết in 2025

Background information
- Born: Trần Thị Minh Tuyết; October 15, 1976 (age 49); Ho Chi Minh City, Vietnam
- Genres: Pop music
- Occupation: Singer
- Instrument: Vocal
- Years active: 1995–present
- Labels: Kim Lợi, Tình, Thúy Nga
- Spouse: Diệp Nghi Keith (m. 2013)

Trần Thị Minh Tuyết (born October 15, 1976, in Ho Chi Minh City) better known as Minh Tuyết, is a Vietnamese-American pop singer, currently performing on Thúy Nga's Paris by Night. Her sisters are Cẩm Ly and Hà Phương who perform with her as part of the cast of Paris By Night. She is known in the Vietnamese-American culture as the Vietnamese Pop Princess.

== Biography ==
Trần Thị Minh Tuyết, which in English literally means "Morning Snow", was born on 15 October 1976 in a family of four sisters and two brothers. Minh Tuyết had a passion for music early in her childhood. She started to perform in public when little. Her father is a music enthusiast who also wrote his own songs primarily as a hobby. Two of Minh Tuyết's elder sisters are singers Cẩm Ly and Hà Phương.

Minh Tuyết started her professional career at the age of 17 when she first appeared on the music stage at Trống Đồng in Ho Chi Minh City. With a strong passion for singing, Minh Tuyết was determined to follow in her sister Cẩm Ly's footsteps and pursue a career in singing. Initially, her parents had not approved her wishes, fearing that she would not be able to handle a life in the public eye, but they later gave permission.

Minh Tuyết signed a music contract with Tình Music and featured in her first video with the company's series number 3. Her first song, "Em Vẫn Đợi Anh", drew more attention from the Vietnamese audience. In many years with Tinh Music, Minh Tuyết released numerous hits, including Lang Thang, Quán Vắng Một Mình, Bờ Bến Lạ, Mãi Là Người Đến Sau, etc. Despite her success, the company decided to release a solo video containing the only voice of Minh Tuyết with "Về Cuối Đường Tình" in DVD, VHS, and CD formats.

In mid-2002, Minh Tuyết was touring with the host of Paris by Night Nguyễn Ngọc Ngạn in Australia when her voice captured his attention. He reached out to the producers of Thúy Nga Productions and introduced her to the company. At the time, Minh Tuyết finished her long-term contract with Tinh Music and decided to sign with Thúy Nga. Her first performance with the company was in Paris, France for Paris by Night 65.

Only six years later, in 2008, Minh Tuyết was paired with male singer Bằng Kiều as a duet pair and partner. This immediately paid off when they released their first duet album, Bởi Vì Anh Yêu Em for Paris by Night 93, catching everyone's attention. At the time, Thúy Nga Productions did not have any idea that they would sing together at all. After that, they appeared and paired in many Paris by Night shows, concerts, and CDs/albums together, and many fans praised them as the "perfect duo".

Currently, Minh Tuyết's social media includes a Facebook page and a YouTube channel.

In 2024, Minh Tuyết participated in the reality TV show Chị đẹp đạp gió (season 2), where she was nicknamed "Mother Tuyết" by fellow contestants, the media, and the audience. She became one of the ten beautiful women who formed the music group "Hoa Đạp Gió" after the show. In April 2025, she performed in the show's music festival titled Chị đẹp: 30 chưa từng là một giới hạn along with 48 other female artists in Thủ Đức City (now Thủ Đức Ward, Ho Chi Minh City).

== Discography ==
=== Kim Lợi Studio ===
- Mưa Bụi: Tình Đã Bay Xa (1995 to 1997): Cassette & VHS by Kim Lợi Studio, Trẻ Films and Saigon Audio-Video.

=== Tình Music Productions ===
==== Quê Hương Tình Yêu & Tuổi Trẻ 3 ====
1. Em Vẫn Đợi Anh - Minh Tuyết

==== Quê Hương Tình Yêu & Tuổi Trẻ 4 ====
1. Tình Xuân - Hạ Vy, Minh Tuyết, Tú Quyên, Lưu Mỹ Linh, Johnny Dũng, Khánh Hoàng, Bảo Huy, Tuấn Thông
2. Chiều Xuân - Minh Tuyết
3. Trái Tim Không Ngủ Yên - Johnny Dũng, Minh Tuyết

==== Quê Hương Tình Yêu & Tuổi Trẻ 5 ====
1. Cà Phê Một Mình - Minh Tuyết
2. Một Thời Đã Xa - Johnny Dũng, Minh Tuyết
3. Liên Khúc Vào Hạ & Sha-La-La - Johnny Dũng, Huy Vũ, Hạ Vy, Minh Tuyết, Tú Quyên, Lưu Mỹ Linh

==== Quê Hương Tình Yêu & Tuổi Trẻ 6 - Happy Y2K ====
1. Happy Y2k - Hạ Vy, Minh Tuyết, Tú Quyên, Diễm Liên, Lưu Mỹ Linh, Johnny Dũng, Nhật Quân, Tuấn Thông
2. Mắt Buồn - Minh Tuyết
3. Anh Hùng Xạ Điêu - Johnny Dũng, Minh Tuyết

==== Quê Hương Tình Yêu & Tuổi Trẻ 7 ====
MC: Quỳnh Huơng, Anh Dũng

1. Lang Thang - Minh Tuyết
2. Em Về Tinh Khôi - Minh Tuyết, Johnny Dũng

==== Quê Hương Tình Yêu & Tuổi Trẻ 8 ====
1. Kiếp Ca Sầu - Minh Tuyết, Huy Vũ
2. Ta Chẳng Còn Ai - Minh Tuyết

==== Quê Hương Tình Yêu & Tuổi Trẻ 9 ====
1. Bờ Bến Lạ - Minh Tuyết
2. Nếu Phôi Pha Ngày Mai - Minh Tuyết, Huy Vũ

==== Quê Hương Tình Yêu & Tuổi Trẻ 10 ====
MC: Nguyễn Dương

1. Liên Khúc Tình - Minh Tuyết, Hạ Vy, Tú Quyên, Diễm Liên, Thành Trực, Huy Vũ, Hoài Vũ, Duy Linh, Johnny Dũng
2. Muộn Màng - Minh Tuyết
3. Mưa Buồn - Minh Tuyết, Huy Vũ

==== Quê Hương Tình Yêu & Tuổi Trẻ 11 ====
MC: Nguyẽ̂n Dương

1. Liên Khúc Tophits - Minh Tuyết, Tâm Đoan, Hạ Vy, Diễm Liên, Thanh Truc, Rebecca Quỳnh Giao, Vina Uyên Mỹ, La Sương Sương, Huy Vũ, Tiến Dũng, Minh Chánh, Nhật Trung, Johnny Dũng
2. Mãi Là Người Đến Sau - Minh Tuyết
3. Liên Khúc Dân Ca - Hạ Vy, Tâm Đoan, Minh Tuyết
4. Huơng Rượu Tình Nồng - Minh Tuyết, Huy Vũ

==== Quê Hương Tình Yêu & Tuổi Trẻ 12 ====
MC: Minh Nhí, Phi Nhung, Hạ Vy, Tường Nguyên

1. Liên Khúc Cha Cha Cha - Minh Tuyết, Hạ Vy, Vina Uyên Mỹ, Rebecca Quỳnh Giao, Cát Ly, Huy Vũ, Minh Chánh, Đan Phượng, Tiến Dũng, Tuấn Hải
2. Dẫu Có Muộn Màng - Minh Tuyết
3. Đã Xa Cuộc Tình - Minh Tuyết, Cẩm Ly

==== Quê Hương Tình Yêu & Tuổi Trẻ 13 ====
MC: Orchid Lâm Quỳnh, Kevin Khoa, Don Hồ, Hạ Vy, Huy Vũ

1. Liên Khúc Tophits 2 - Minh Tuyết, Hạ Vy, Vina Uyên Mỹ, Gia Linh, Tú Quyên, Thúy Vân, Huy Vũ, Gia Huy, Phillip Huy, Tuấn Hưng, Kevin Khoa, Minh Chánh
2. Sao Anh Ra Di - Minh Tuyết

==== Quê Hương Tình Yêu & Tuổi Trẻ 14 - Memories of Shanghai ====
1. Dẫu Tình Đã Xa - Minh Tuyết

==== Quê Hương Tình Yêu & Tuổi Trẻ 15 - Seoul, beautiful days ====
1. Người Về Cuối Phố - Minh Tuyết

==== Quê Hương Tình Yêu & Tuổi Trẻ 16 - Music Video, Live Show ====
1. Quê Tôi - Minh Tuyết

==== Quê Hương Tình Yêu & Tuổi Trẻ 17 - Tình Music MTV in Thailand ====
1. Tình Ta Thiết Tha - Johnny Dũng, Minh Tuyết

==== Solo albums ====
- Yêu Nhau Ghét Nhau (First solo studio album in US)
- Cho Em Một Ngày
- Lang Thang
- Và Em Còn Mãi Yêu Anh
- Mắt Buồn
- Trở Về Phố Cũ
- Bờ Bến Lạ
- Muộn Màng, Góc Phố Buồn
- Mãi Là Người Đến Sau
- Về Cuối Đường Tình
- Sao Anh Ra Đi?
- The Best of Minh Tuyết from Tình Music

==== Duet albums ====
- Trái Tim Không Ngủ Yên (Duets with Johnny Dũng)
- Tình Yêu Muôn Thuở (Duets with Johnny Dũng)
- Tinh Đơn Phương (Duets with Huy Vũ)
- Chân Tình (Duets with Huy Vũ)

==== Trio albums ====
- Liên Khúc Tình (with Tú Quyên & Johnny Dũng)
- The Best of Minh Tuyết Song Ca (with Johnny Dũng & Huy Vũ)
- Tình Chưa Đến, Tình Đã Vội Bay (with Huy Vũ & Thúy Khanh)

==== DVD ====
- Minh Tuyết MTV DVD 1: Về Cuối Đường Tình

=== Thúy Nga Productions ===
==== Solo albums ====
- Làm Sao Anh Biết (TNCD300), 2003
- Ngày Xưa Anh Hỡi (TNCD325), 2004
- Ðóa Hồng Ðẫm Máu (TNCD348), 2005
- Yêu Một Người Sống Bên Một Người (TNCD402), 2007
- Đã Không Còn Hối Tiếc (TNCD448), 2009
- Yêu Không Nuối Tiếc (TNCD499), 2011
- Một Đời Em Đã Yêu (TNCD519), 2013
- Anh Muốn Em Sống Sao (TNCD545), 2014

==== Duet albums ====
- Bởi Vì Anh Yêu Em with Bằng Kiều (TNCD372), 2006
- Một Lần Nữa Xin Có Nhau with Bằng Kiều (TNCD449), 2010
- Xin Lỗi Anh - Best Of Duets (TNCD480), 2010
- Lâu Đài Tình Ái with Bằng Kiều (TNCD537), 2014

==== DVDs ====
- Mơ Những Ngày Nắng Lên - Video Nhạc & Karaoke (TNDVDKARAMT01), 2005
- Đã Không Yêu Thì Thôi - The Best Of Minh Tuyết - Karaoke & Music Video (TNDVDKARMT), 2007
- Yêu Một Người Sống Bên Một Người - Music Video & Karaoke - Volume 2 (TNDVDKARMT), 2008
- Ca Nhạc Phim Truyện - Tôi Mơ! Tình Anh...Tình Em (TNDVDMT), 2010
- Minh Tuyết Live Show - Kỷ Niệm 10 Năm Trình Diễn (MTDVD001), 2011
- Anh Muốn Em Sống Sao - The Best of Minh Tuyết 3 - Karaoke (MTDVD3), 2015

== Live shows ==
Year	Show	System	Role	With
2015	Giọng hát Việt nhí (season 3)	VTV3	Adviser for the Cẩm Ly team	Cẩm Ly
2016	Tuyệt đỉnh song ca	HTV7	Trainer	Noo Phước Thịnh
2017	Tuyệt đỉnh song ca nhí	HTV7	Examiner	Cẩm Ly
2017	Ai sẽ thành sao	HTV7	Trainer	
2017	Ca sĩ giấu mặt	HTV7	Guest star	
2018	Ai sẽ thành sao (season 2)	HTV7	Trainer	
2018	Ca sĩ thần tượng	HTV7	Examiner	
2018	Tuyệt đỉnh song ca (season 3)	HTV7	Trainer	Quang Lê
2018	VSTAR (season 5)	ThuyNga	Examiner	Thái Châu, Trần Thu Hà, Nguyễn Hồng Nhung, Huỳnh Thi, Chí Tài
2019	An So Hoan Hao	HTV	Examiner	Chí Tài
2020	Ký ức vui vẻ (season 3)	VTV3	Guest star	
2021	Ca sĩ thần tượng (season 4)	HTV7	Examiner	
2023	Ca sĩ mặt nạ (season 2)	HTV7	Guest star with her secret name Dứa Minh Tinh	Tóc Tiên, Bích Phương
2024	Chị đẹp đạp gió (season 2)	VTV3	Candidate	
2024	The Khang Show (episode 90)	YouTube	Guest star	
2025	Showbiz 8	DanTri	Guest star	

== See also ==
- Bằng Kiều
- Cảnh Hàn
- Cẩm Ly
- Đan Trường
- Lam Trường
- Sỹ Ben
- Trizzie Phương Trinh
- Hà Phương
