= Primary School Songbooks (Japanese) =

Songbooks compiled for school education

The Primary School Songbooks (Japanese: 小学唱歌集, Shōgaku Shōka Shū) are a series of songbooks compiled for school education by the Japanese Ministry of Education's Music Investigation Committee (Japanese: 音楽取調掛), which was founded in 1879 by Isawa Shuji. The songbooks were published from 1881 through 1884 in three volumes. The series marks the first time staff notation was used in Japanese music textbooks.

Volume I included 33 songs; Volume II, 16 songs; and Volume III, 42 songs. They were mostly original Japanese texts set to Western melodies taken from such songs as "Hänschen klein" in Volume 1, "Alle Vögel sind schon da" in Volume II, and "The Last Rose of Summer" in Volume III.

== See also ==
- Music of Japan
- Monbushō shōka
- Translated songs (Japanese)
