= Translated songs (Japanese) =

The Translated songs (Japanese: 翻訳唱歌, Honyaku shōka, meaning "translated songs") in the narrow sense are the foreign-language songs that were translated into Japanese, when Western-style songs were introduced into school education in the Meiji era (the latter half of the 19th century) of Japan. They were distinguished from the songs which appeared in the music textbooks of the Ministry of Education that were made by the Japanese. Translated songs in a broader sense means any foreign language songs that have been translated into Japanese.

== Translated songs by language ==
Here are typical translated songs in both narrow and broader senses:

Chinese
- Zai Na Yaoyuan De Difang
- Mo Li Hua

English
- Home! Sweet Home!
- Comin' Thro' the Rye

French
- Sur le pont d'Avignon
- Plaisir d'amour

German
- Am Brunnen vor dem Tore
- Wenn ich ein Vöglein wär

Korean

- Arirang
- Doraji

Russian
- Po dikim stepyam Zabaikalya
- The Song of the Volga Boatmen

== See also ==
- Music of Japan
- Monbushō shōka (文部省唱歌)
- Primary School Songbooks (Japanese) (小学唱歌集), edited by Isawa Shūji and published in 1879–84.
