= WBIM-FM =

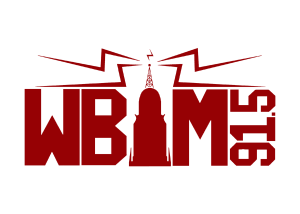
- Bridgewater, Massachusetts; United States
- Frequency: 91.5 MHz
- Branding: 91.5 WBIM

Programming
- Format: Campus radio; alternative rock

Ownership
- Owner: Bridgewater State University

History
- First air date: November 1, 1972; 53 years ago

Technical information
- Licensing authority: FCC
- Facility ID: 6820
- Class: A
- ERP: 180 watts
- HAAT: 22 meters (72 ft)
- Transmitter coordinates: 41°59′15.3″N 70°58′19.1″W

Links
- Public license information: Public file; LMS
- Webcast: Listen live (via TuneIn)
- Website: www.bridgew.edu/student-life/student-media

WBIM-FM (91.5 FM) is a non-commercial, educational radio station broadcasting 24/7 from the campus of Bridgewater State University. The station has a mostly alternative and indie rock format during regular automation, but the station does have many specialty shows which cater to such formats as R&B, metal, jazz, hip hop, sports, decade specific, and many other formats. Licensed to Bridgewater, Massachusetts, United States, the station is owned by Bridgewater State University.

== History ==
WBIM-FM went on the air November 1, 1972, as a non-commercial 10-watt Class D FM station. On April 2, 1982, at 3 p.m., WBIM-FM increased its power to the current 180 watts (ERP, H/V). On July 7, 1982, WBIM-FM switched to stereo at 7 p.m.
