= Hà Phương =

Vietnamese singer

- Born: Trần Thị Hà Phương; March 31, 1972 (age 54); Saigon, South Vietnam
- Genres: Yellow music; Nhạc trữ tình
- Occupation: Singer
- Instrument: Vocals
- Labels: Thúy Nga Productions; Asia Entertainment; Thế Giới Nghệ Thuật
- Spouse: Chính Chu (m. 2002)
- Website: www.haphuongworld.com

Trần Thị Hà Phương (born 31 March 1972) is a Vietnamese singer. She is the second oldest sister of three singing sisters: Cẩm Ly, who runs a Saigon record company, and Vietnamese pop star Minh Tuyết.

== Early life ==
Phuong grew up in Saigon, South Vietnam, where she dreamed of being a performer, and was a shy and timid child.

Phuong and her sisters represented their school in local and nationwide singing competitions in Vietnam. They also got airplay on VPOP (Vietnamese pop music) stations.

== Career ==
=== Music ===
After she graduated from high school, Phuong enrolled in the College of Arts and Culture, District 10 Culture House, where she took dance and music classes. She also took private vocal classes and studied Vietnamese/Broadway musicals.

Phuong got her start performing at entertainment venues in Vietnam:

In Vietnam, being a professional singer doesn't mean you're a star or a diva. Therefore, when I first started I had to wait to sing after big stars finished their performances. If no big stars were there, then it would be my turn."

She got her break when her song "Hoa Cau Vuon Trau" was played during halftime of the 1994 World Cup, which was broadcast in Vietnam.

=== Book ===
Phuong wrote a book in 2017 titled Finding Julia, which was inspired by her life. In the book, a Eurasian acting student is haunted by the death of her mother, and her own secret desires.

=== Film ===
A film version of "Finding Julia"—starring Phuong, Andrew McCarthy and Richard Chamberlain—premiered on October 28, 2017 at the Third Annual Asian World Film Festival in Los Angeles.

Phuong, who studied acting at the TVI Actors Studio in New York, found making the film a challenge:

I completely forgot the fact that this is not my Vietnam and nobody knows who I am. Not to mention all of the difficulties while shooting and writing the screenplay, but I had already gone too far to go back. Have you ever experienced the dilemma of making progress yet unable to go back? The feeling was that I was lost in the ocean. It was a truly horrifying nightmare! Ha Phuong and Julia in the movie both have nightmares. And we both tell ourselves "Where there's a will there's a way and I won’t give up." My journey is still ongoing and it is a valuable experience in my life as an artist.

The film included her English language song "Lost in a Dream."

== Personal life ==
Moving from Vietnam to the U.S. was an adjustment for Phuong:

I grew up in Vietnam before and after the Vietnam-American conflict. At that time, life in Vietnam was much simpler than in the United States and this greatly affects everyone in terms of personality, custom and culture. The most obvious example is the difference in the daily interactions of the people.

Phuong is still pursuing her artistic endeavors:

Vietnam's entertainment industry has been evolving remarkably over many years but we still have a way to go. I am fish in a pond in Vietnam and in the United States, I am a fish in one of the Great Lakes. I understand the demands and requirements of the industry so I try my best to pursue my career and make it successful.

== Philanthropy ==
All the profits from Phương's DVD/CD sales, concerts and films go to fund the Ha Phuong Foundation.

Phuong created the foundation in 2008 to help underprivileged children with their housing, surgery, food, clothing, and education. The foundation also funds instruments, vocational training and career development for blind children.

Phuong contributes to the Vietnam Relief Effort, a non-profit organization created by her husband and his sister. The charity helps fund Vietnamese schools, surgeries for war veterans/disabled people, and brings Vietnamese doctors to the U.S. for medical training.
