= David B. Sullivan =

American politician

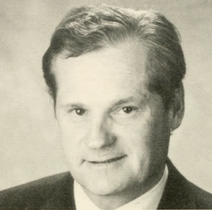
- Portrait of David B. Sullivan

Member of the Massachusetts House of Representatives from the 6th Bristol district
- In office 1997 – April 28, 2013
- Preceded by: Albert Herren
- Succeeded by: Carole Fiola

Personal details
- Born: June 6, 1953 (age 73) Fall River, Massachusetts
- Party: Democratic
- Education: Bristol Community College; Southeastern Massachusetts University; Bridgewater State College
- Occupation: Psychiatric social worker, politician

David B. Sullivan (born June 6, 1953 in Fall River, Massachusetts) was a member of the Massachusetts House of Representatives, representing the 6th Bristol District. He is a member of the Democratic Party.

He is a graduate of Bristol Community College and Southeastern Massachusetts University, and completed his graduate studies at Bridgewater State College. He was a member of the Fall River City Council from 1992 to 1997, served in the Massachusetts House of Representatives from 1997 to 2013, and he was the executive director of the Fall River Housing Authority from 2013 until his retirement in 2017.
