= Cẩm Ly =

Vietnamese singer

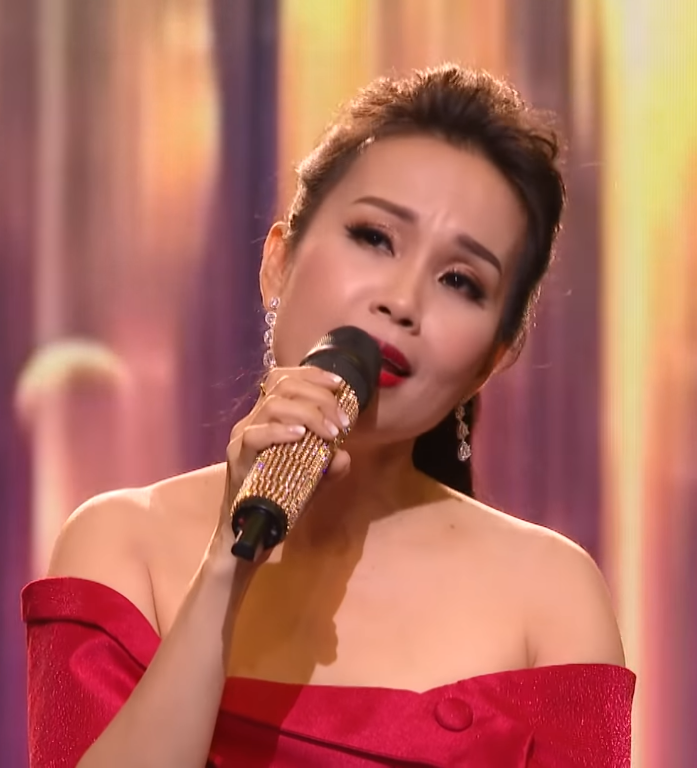

Background information
- Born: Trần Thị Cẩm Ly; Saigon, South Vietnam
- Origin: Ho Chi Minh City, Vietnam
- Genres: Pop, folk
- Occupation: Singer
- Instrument: Vocal
- Years active: 1993–present
- Label: Kim Lợi Studio
- Spouse: Minh Vy (m. 2004)
- Website: camly.com.vn

Trần Thị Cẩm Ly better known as Cẩm Ly, is a Vietnamese singer known for singing pop and Southern Vietnamese folk music.

She came to national attention in 1993. Her sisters are Minh Tuyết and Hà Phương.

== Background ==
Her full name is Trần Thị Cẩm Ly and was born in Saigon. Her parents originated from Quy Nhơn in old Bình Định (now part of Gia Lai province). She is the third child (her fan named her Chi Tu according to Southern order in the family) of family with six siblings, her father is composer Trần Quang Hiển, her two younger sisters are Hà Phương and Minh Tuyết who are also singers. In 2004, she married composer Minh Vy (full name; Doan Huu Minh). She has two daughters, one is Cam Uyen (born in 2005) and Cam Anh (born in 2007).

== Music career ==
She exposed her singing talent when she was little. In 1993, she and Minh Tuyết performed a song for which the same year they won duo first prize from Hoa Binh Theater. After this event, she began singing professionally and signed a contract with Kim Loi Studio – which was the most famous studio at that time.

In 1997, Minh Tuyết moved to the US and she had to temporarily stop performing due to health issue. One year later, she came back and released two albums featuring singer Canh Han, in 1999, she and singer Dan Truong released the album Neu Phoi Pha Ngay Mai. In 2000, she marked her solo career by releasing the first album Mai Khong Phai.

In next years, she often performed songs from composer Nguyen Nhat Huy such as: Nguoi Ve Cuoi Pho, Bo Ben La, Thuong Nho Nguoi Dung, May Chieu, Tinh Khong Doi Thay. Her first ever folk album titled Em Gai Que was released by Kim Loi Studio. It consisted of 11 songs under influence of folk songs: Quen Cay Cau Dua, Noi Buon Chim Sao, Phuong Buon, Chanh Long, Nho Me Ly Mo Coi, Mua Chieu Mien Trung.

In July 2001, she was the first Vietnamese singer to have a DVD show and it was the period of time where she Solidified her stable style and completely separated with Dan Truong. She was one of the most successful exclusive singer of Kim Loi Studio.

She was also the first singer to hold a free concert for students which was titled as Vong Quanh Ky Tuc Xa in 2003 and 2004.

In 2008, she held another live show at Lan Anh Stage as a 15th anniversary and to celebrate her first ever role in a Cải Lương play. The same year, she appeared in Thúy Nga's Paris by Night 92 show.

In 2009, she held the live show Tu Tinh Que Huong which was the second live show of her career as well as releasing two albums Em Khong The Quen – Tinh Khuc Minh Vy and ballad folk album Bien Tinh.

In 2011, she held the third live show titled Tu Tinh Que Huong 2 with four different genres: ballad, folk, pop and ancient Cải Lương.

In 2012, she held the live show Tu Tinh Que Huong 3.

In 2013, she and Minh Tuyết held the live show Tu Tinh Que Huong 4 as 20th anniversary of both sisters. The live show was held for two nights at Hoa Binh Theater, Ho Chi Minh City with large audiences.

In 2014, she was the coach of The Voice Kid Vietnam and made Thien Nhan a winner of second season. At the same time, she and Minh Vy were the duo coach of the show Vo Chong Minh Hat and also the winner.

In 2015, she continued with Tu Tinh Que Huong, bringing its fifth installment to Hoa Binh Theater, Ho Chi Minh City.

== Reception ==
From 2001 to 2006, she was repeatadly voted to be one of the top 10 favorite singer of Green Wave Awards.

She was one of the pioneers for giving free concert for students as she held live shows at 5 different dormitories in Ho Chi Minh City.

In June 2015, YouTube introduced Music Insight and she was the only Vietnamese singer to have the highest views on YouTube. The statistic was rated from September 2014 to June 2015 based on Content ID, she had totally 757 million of views, the second was Dam Vinh Hung (450 million views).

== Solo albums ==
- Tình cuối mùa đông (the best of Cẩm Ly), 2000
- vol 1. Mãi không phai, 2000
- vol 2. Phố hoa – Cơn mơ hoang đường, 2001
- vol 3. Bến vắng – Biết yêu khi nào, 2002
- Cánh chim lạc loài, single, 2002
- vol 4. Tuổi mộng xứ đông – 12 bến nước, 2002
- Sáo sang sông – Mùa đông xứ lạ, 2003
- Tình Khúc Nguyễn Nhất Huy, 2003
- vol 5. Có những chiều em đến – Hoài công, 2003
- vol 6. Người nhớ không người – Em sẽ là người ra đi, 2004
- vol 7. Người ơi hãy chia tay, 2005
- Em gái quê, 2005
- Mùa mưa đi qua – Em về kẻo trời mưa, 2005
- vol 8. Kẻ đứng sau tình yêu, 2005
- Người đến sau – Sao anh ra đi, 2005
- Buồn con sáo sậu, 2006
- vol 9. Áng mây buồn, 2006
- Tiếng thạch sùng, 2007
- vol 10. Em sẽ quên – Đêm có mưa rơi, 2007
- Khi đã yêu, 2007
- Chuyện chúng mình, 2008
- vol 11. Đợi chờ những mùa đông, 2008
- Em không thể quên, 2009
- Biển tình, 2009
- vol 12. Biển trắng pha lê, 2010
- Gió lên, 2010
- Chuyện tình hoa bướm, 2010
- Nửa trái tim, 2011
- Tôi mơ – Cô Tư bến phà, 2011
- Thiên đàng ái ân – Chiều cuối tuần, 2011
- Về bên em, 2012
- Sầu đâu quê ngoại, 2012
- Hát cho người tình nhớ, 2014
- Hai lối mộng, 2015

== Awards ==
- Top Ten The Best Singer Green Wave, 2001-2002
- Favorite singer of Purple Ink newspaper, 2001-2002
- Favorite singer Thursday Afternoon Club, 2001-2002
- Mai Vang Award by the newspaper Workers organize 2002
- Top ten most favorite singer Green Wave, 2002-2003
- Top ten most favorite singer Green Wave, 2003-2004
- League VTV – Songs I Love – "You Never Know Love", 2003-2004
- Top ten most favorite singer Green Wave, 2004-2005
- League VTV – Songs I Love – "The Corn is Mo" – 2005
- Mai Vang Award by the Newspaper Workers Organisation 2005
- Top ten most favorite singer Green Wave, 2005-2006
- Top ten most favorite singer Green Wave, 2006-2007
- Top 10 Green Wave achievements 10 years from 1997 to 2007
- Top ten most favorite singer Green Wave, 2007-2008
- Video Music Excellence Award Mai Vang 08 – Mai Vang 09
- Women folk singer favorite at Mai Vang Award 2007
- Women folk singer favorite at Mai Vang Award 2008
- 2008: received the Guinness Vietnam with notebooks reformist "Lan and Diep"
- Women folk singer favorite at Mai Vang Award 2009
- Award singer represents the most successful straight gold album 12-2009
- Female artists represent the most successful 2009 "Album Gio Len"
- Female singers are the most popular 2009 "Album Em khong the quen"
- Singer of the Year "Dedication Music Awards 2009"
- League Most Outstanding Female Artist – Mark Indian Mai Vang 15 years – 2009
- Women folk singer favorite at Mai Vang Award 2010
- Top ten most favorite singer Green Wave, 2010-2011
- Female Singer Award favorite HTV Awards 2011
- Top 5 best singer – Table GOLD Green Wave, 2014
- Singing songs for the music copyright collecting remember most from Nhaccuatui.com votes – 2014
- Month 6/2015: BBC, YouTube announced new analytics tools Music Insight has confirmed singer Cam Ly of Vietnam as singer with the most views 860 in Vietnam with more than a million views on YouTube (data access Monthly 7/2015). Music Insight are information of more than 10,000 most popular artists on YouTube and Google two vehicles, including Vietnam artists. [2]
- Republic of socialist Vietnam awarded certificates of merit multiple times.
