= Bristol Community College =

College in Fall River, Massachusetts, US

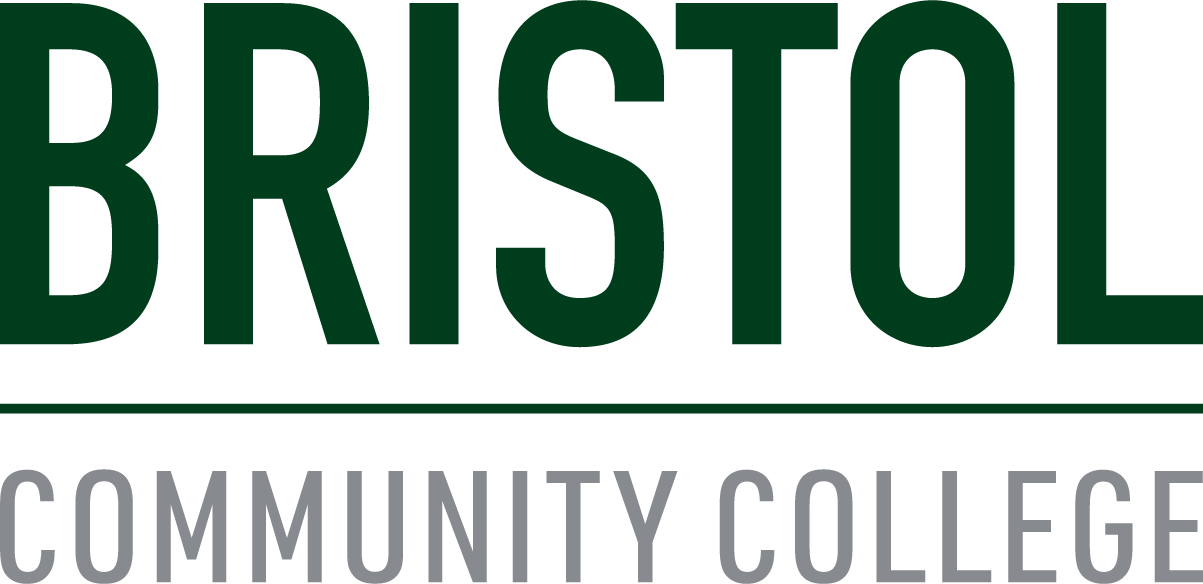
- Type: Public community college
- Established: December 1965
- Accreditation: NECHE
- President: Sedgwick L. Harris, Ed.D
- Administrative staff: 432
- Students: 5,822 (fall 2022)
- Location: Fall River, New Bedford, Attleboro, Taunton, Massachusetts, United States; 41°43′19.68″N 71°7′13.99″W
- Campus: Suburban, 65 acres (26 ha)
- Colors: Green & gray
- Nickname: Bristol Bayhawks
- Sporting affiliations: NJCAA Division III
- Mascot: Bayhawk
- Website: www.bristolcc.edu

Bristol Community College (Bristol) is a public community college with four campuses in Southeastern Massachusetts.

== History ==
The college was originally established in December 1965 when it was instituted by the Massachusetts Board of Regional Community Colleges. The college originally only existed at 64 Durfee Street with a lease from Southeastern Massachusetts Technical Institute (the current University of Massachusetts Dartmouth), but the college eventually expanded to a full campus on 774 Elsbree Street in the mid-1970s.

== Campuses ==
The Fall River campus is located on 65 acres (260,000 m^{2}) of land at 777 Elsbree Street. There are three additional campuses in New Bedford located at 800 Purchase Street, Attleboro located at 11 Field Road (which is shared with Bridgewater State University) and Taunton located at 2 Hamilton St.

Prior to 2014, Bristol held Taunton operations through day and night classes at Cohannet School and Benjamin A. Friedman Middle School, respectively. In 2014 it occupied the former Taunton Catholic Middle School in Taunton, which now houses a satellite campus of its own. In 2021, it moved to the centrally located former Coyle & Cassidy Memorial High School. Prior to 2019, Bristol was located in the now demolished Silver City Galleria.

== Academics ==
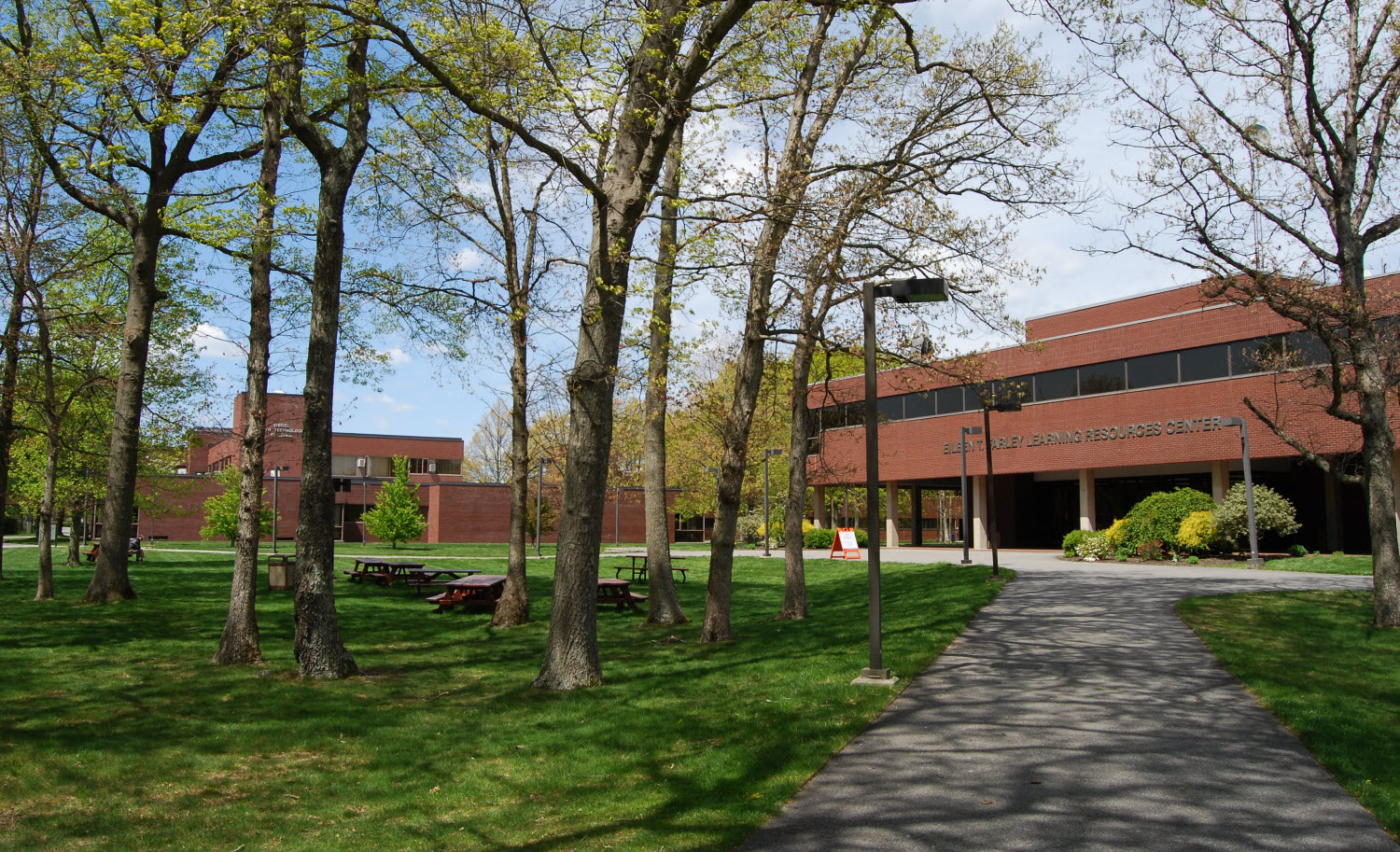
Bristol's Fall River Campus

Bristol Community College offers associate degrees and certificates in over 150 academic programs, ranging from Associate of Science degrees, Associate of Arts degrees, Associate of Applied Science degrees, and a wide range of certificates. Bristol Community College is accredited by the New England Commission of Higher Education.

== Student life ==
At the end of the 2010–11 year, Bristol Community College had an undergraduate population of 12,123 day and evening credit students, along with an additional 17,439 in noncredit enrollments. The average annual tuition and fees for in-state students was around $4,166, whereas the out-of-state students paid, on average, about $9,482 in total annual tuition and fees. The average cost for a 3 credit course is approximately $498, equivalent to about $166 per credit.

== Athletics ==
The Bristol's athletic program was re-established in 2008. Under the guidance of Brian Fernandes as the athletic director, the college now competes in the National Junior College Athletic Association (NJCAA) in five varsity sports: men's and women's soccer in the fall, men's and women's basketball in the winter, and men's golf in the spring. The current mascot is the "Bristol Bayhawk."

== Notable people ==
- William E. Kaufman, professor of philosophy, author of several theology books including Journeys: An Introductory Guide to Jewish Mysticism, The Case for God, A Question of Faith: An Atheist and a Rabbi Debate the Existence of God With Morton Shor and The Evolving God in Jewish Process Theology.
- Dana Mohler-Faria, former BCC Assistant Dean of Administrative Services (served from 1984 to 1987), former president of Bridgewater State College and the Special Advisor for Education to the former Massachusetts Governor Deval Patrick.
- David B. Sullivan, member of the Massachusetts House of Representatives (1997–2013)
- Howard Tinberg, professor of English, the Carnegie Foundation's Outstanding Community College Professor of 2004.
