= Howard Tinberg =

Howard B. Tinberg (born March 6, 1953) is an American academic who is a retired professor of English at Bristol Community College in Fall River, Massachusetts.

== Teacher ==
Tinberg taught composition and literature, and encouraged ethnographic research by his students into literacy among their families and communities.

== Awards ==
He was awarded the title Outstanding Community College Professor of 2004 by the Carnegie Foundation.

He is a former Chair of the Conference on College Composition and Communication, the premier, national organization for teachers of college writing.

He was selected as Museum Teaching Fellow at the US Holocaust Memorial Museum.

He is a recipient of the Nell Ann Picket award for service to the two-year college.

His essay, “Reconsidering Transfer at the Community College: Challenges and Opportunities,” received the Mark Reynolds award for best article of the year in the journal, “Teaching English in the Two-Year College.”

== Editor ==
He is a former editor of the journal Teaching English in the Two-Year College.

== Author ==
He has authored Writing With Consequence: What Writing Does in the Disciplines, and Border Talk: Writing and Knowing in the Two-Year College. He has co-authored or co-edited, “The Community College Writer: Exceeding Expectations,” “What is College-Level Writing, Vols, 1 and 2,” “Teaching Learning and the Holocaust,” and “Deep Reading: Teaching Reading in the Writing Classroom.”
