= Bridgewater State University =

Public university in Bridgewater, Massachusetts, US

- Former names: Bridgewater Normal School (1840–1846); Bridgewater State Normal School (1846–1932); Bridgewater State Teachers College (1932–1960); State College at Bridgewater (1960–1965); Bridgewater State College (1965–2010)
- Motto: Not to be Ministered Unto but to Minister
- Type: Public university
- Established: 1840; 186 years ago
- Accreditation: NECHE
- Academic affiliations: Space-grant
- President: Frederick W. Clark
- Students: 9,492 (spring 2025)
- Undergraduates: 7,949
- Postgraduates: 1,543
- Location: Bridgewater, Massachusetts, United States; 41°59′19.04″N 70°57′57.62″W
- Campus: 270 acres (110 ha); Suburban
- Colors: Red, white, & black
- Nickname: Bears
- Sporting affiliations: NCAA D-III (ECAC, MASCAC, LEC, NEWLA)
- Website: bridgew.edu

Bridgewater State University is a public university with its main campus in Bridgewater, Massachusetts, United States. It is the largest of nine state universities in Massachusetts. Including its off-campus sites in New Bedford, Attleboro, and Cape Cod, BSU has the fourth-largest campus of the 29 institutions in the Massachusetts Public Higher Education System. BSU's sports teams are called the Bears. Its school colors are crimson, white, and black.

Bridgewater is referred to as the "home of teacher education in America", and has the largest enrollment of teacher education students in the Commonwealth of Massachusetts. Since the 1960s, the school has expanded its program to include liberal arts, business, and aviation science. It became a university and took on the name Bridgewater State University in 2010. During its history, it has been known as Bridgewater State Normal School (1846), Bridgewater State Teachers College (1932), State Teachers College at Bridgewater (1960), and Bridgewater State College (1965).

== History ==
=== Founding ===
Bridgewater State University was founded by Horace Mann as Bridgewater Normal School. It opened on September 9, 1840, making it the oldest permanently-located institution of public higher education in Massachusetts. As one of the first normal schools in the nation, its initial mission was to train school teachers.

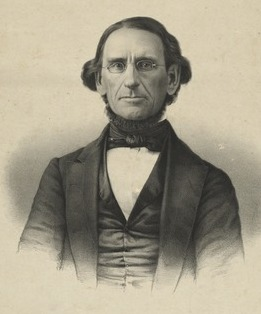
Nicholas Tillinghast, Bridgewater Normal's first principal 1840–53

The normal school opened in the basement of the Old Bridgewater Town Hall, in a 40-foot by 50-foot space, divided into three rooms: an ante-room for students, an apparatus room, and a classroom. The first class consisted of 21 women and seven men. Nicholas Tillinghast, the first principal (1840–53) was initially the only instructor. The school year consisted of two 14-week terms. Students were not required to attend consecutively.

In 1845, the Commonwealth of Massachusetts finally agreed to construct a building for Bridgewater State Normal School, the first building ever erected in America for the preparation of teachers. This two-story wooden building, 64 feet by 42 feet, accommodating 84 students, was to be the institution's educational plant for almost half a century. There were small and large classrooms, with blackboards in each. Since changes were made to the school, the board of education required people to attend three terms for fourteen consecutive weeks, establishing a year's course. The building was dedicated on August 19, 1846, with Horace Mann saying on the occasion:

Among all the lights and shadows that ever crossed my path, this day’s radiance is the brightest...I consider this event as marking an era in the progress of education—which as we all know is the progress of civilization-on this western continent, and throughout the world.

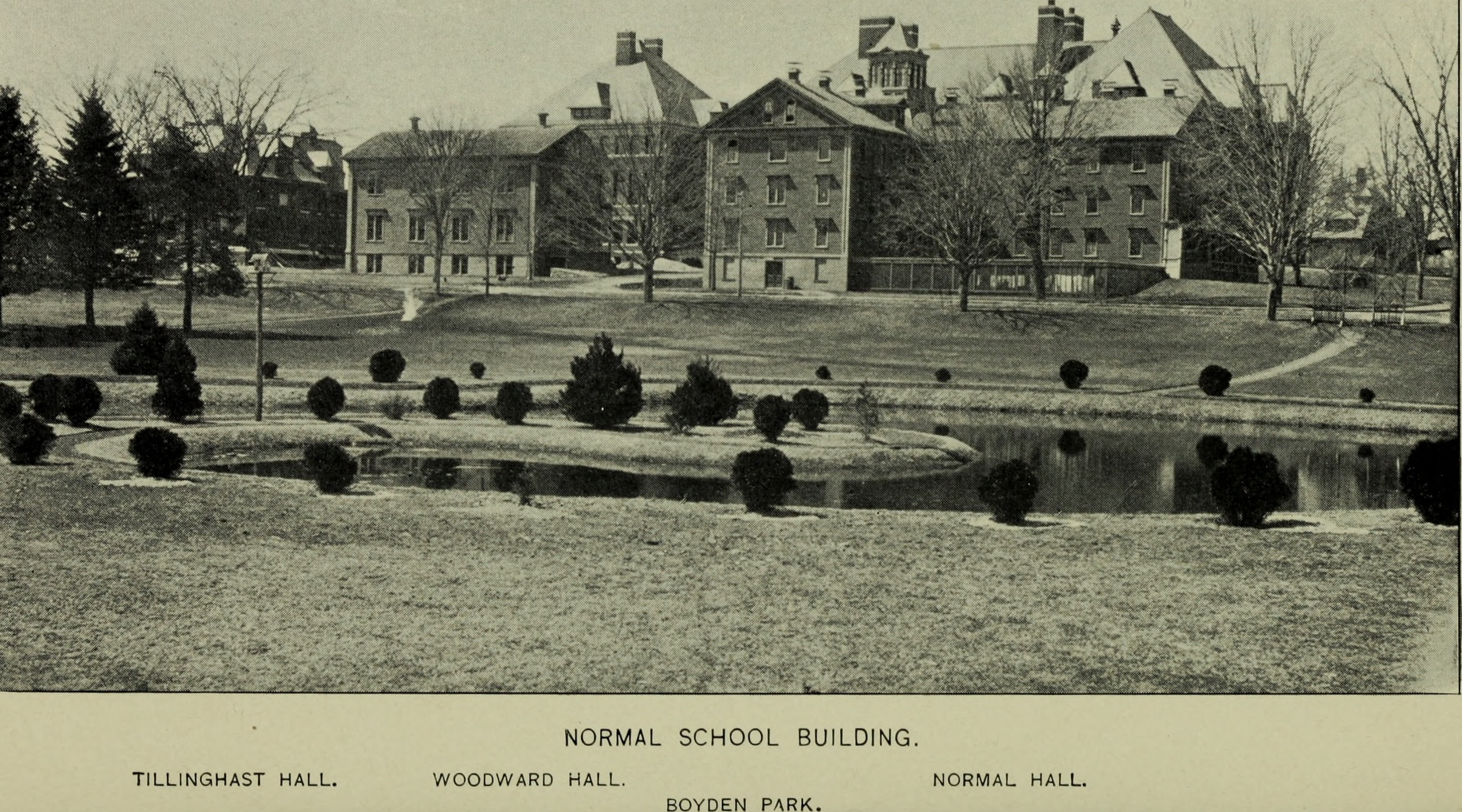
The campus in 1901. Tillinghast Hall, Woodward Hall, and Normal Hall were severely damaged in the 1924 fire

It is the completion of the first normal schoolhouse ever erected in Massachusetts,—in the Union,—in this hemisphere. It belongs to that class of events which may happen once, but are not capable of being repeated. Coiled up in this institution, as in a spring, there is a vigor whose uncoiling may wheel the spheres.

This first normal school established a professional standard for the preparation of teachers, breaking away from traditional academics for attendance. It was the next step toward establishing educational institutions for specific purposes.

Bridgewater Normal School trained its students in elementary-school subjects; expansion subjects above the elementary level including mathematics, philosophy, and literature; and pedagogy, including philosophy of teaching and discipline based on child psychology, and as much practical experience under constant supervision as possible at the model school.

=== 1924 fire ===
An early-morning fire on Wednesday, December 10, 1924, destroyed three of the college's buildings, over half of the campus: Tillinghast Hall, the Training School, and old Woodward dormitories. The Normal School and the boiler room were saved. The fire was so large that other towns' fire departments had to be called to assist. The cause of the fire was not definitely established, but it is believed to have been either "rats or mice" gnawing in the heating ducts, or a spontaneous combustion. There were reportedly no injuries.

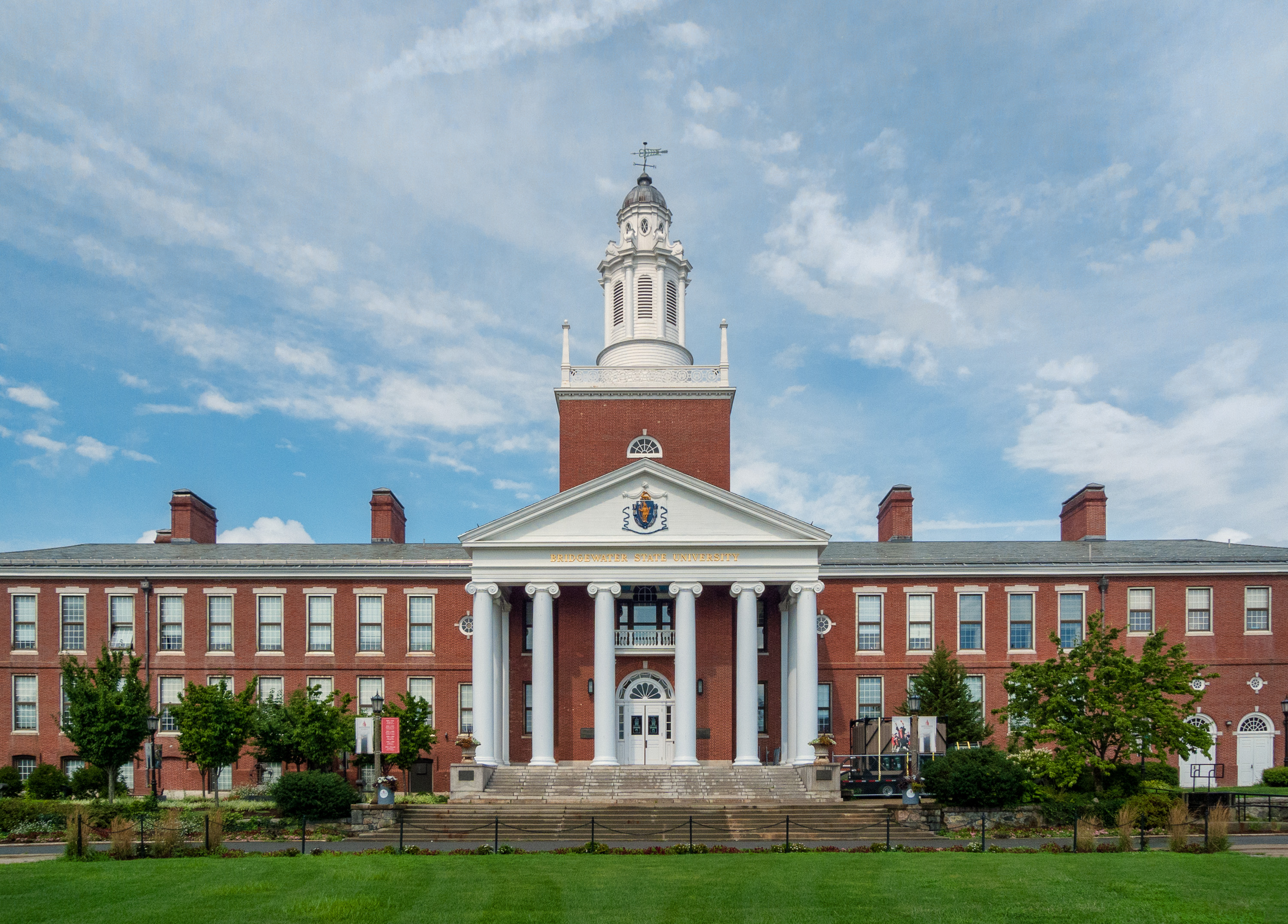
Boyden Hall opened in June 1926

The Normal School and boiler room were repaired immediately. Tillinghast Hall was rebuilt and a new Woodward dorm built. The training school was housed in a different building temporarily and later a new building was built for it exemplifying a well equipped elementary school, with a gym and playground. The total State appropriation for the Normal School repairs and rebuilding of the training school was $606,566, in addition to $86,500 from the town. The Normal Building and Tillinghast Hall were rebuilt and opened in June 1926, now renamed as Boyden Hall and Harrington Hall.

=== Mid twentieth century to present ===
In the 1950s, many veterans of the Korean War enrolled and proms were the highlight of the year for them. In 1957 the John J. Kelly Gym was built and in 1959 SAT scores were required to be submitted for the first time.

During the 1960s the liberal arts curriculum was introduced. The Ivy Exercises, in which the junior class would form an archway with ivy leaves leading up to the school on graduation day, were dying out. In 1960 Pope Hall was built as an all-women's dorm. Scott Hall was built in 1961 as an all-men's dorm. The Marshall Conant Science Building was built in 1964 and was named after the school's second principal. In 1967 Shea and Durgin Halls were built as co-ed dorms.

In 1971 The Clement C. Maxwell Library was completed. In 1976 the tennis courts opened and students could enjoy movies on Sundays and Tuesdays for 25 to 75 cents. From 1970 to 1990 the college expanded and enrollment quadrupled. The number of faculty tripled. During this time, Education became the most popular major, and remains so today.

In 1992 the college established the School of Education and Allied Studies and the School of Arts and Sciences. In 1995 the Moakley Center opened. From 1999 to 2002 the college had an endowment campaign to raise 10 million dollars to support academics.

In 2010 Bridgewater State was one of the Massachusetts state colleges that chose to become a university. This would boost its popularity, attract more contributions, increase student applications and enrollment, and give the school a higher profile. On July 22, 2010, the Massachusetts House of Representatives and Senate voted to give the college university status and change its name to Bridgewater State University. The measure was signed into law by Massachusetts Governor Deval Patrick on July 28, 2010.

=== Presidents ===
- Nicholas Tillinghast (1840–1853)
- Marshall Conant (1853–1860)
- Albert Gardner Boyden (1860–1906)
- Arthur Boyden (1906–1933)
- Zenos E. Scott (1933–1937)
- John J. Kelly (1937–1951)
- Clement C. Maxwell (1951–1962)
- Adrian Rondileau (1962–1986, 1988–1989)
- Gerard T. Indelicato (1986–1987)
- Adrian Tinsley (1989–2002)
- Dana Mohler-Faria (2002–2015)
- Frederick W. Clark Jr. (2015–present)

== Academics ==
Bridgewater State University is accredited by the New England Commission of Higher Education. It is also among America's oldest teacher education institutions and the first to have a building devoted to education of teachers.

The university has 108 majors in 35 areas of studies starting with the popular education, aviation, psychology, accounting, criminal justice and many others. The university has 30 academic departments ranging from Accounting and Finance to Theatre and Dance.

=== Schools to colleges ===
On July 1, 2010, the former School of Arts and Sciences was split into the School of Humanities and Social Sciences and the School of Science and Mathematics. In October 2010, the School of Humanities and Social Sciences, the School of Science and Mathematics, the Ricciardi School of Business and the School of Graduate Studies, were all renamed colleges, and the Department of Social Work was renamed the School of Social Work. The College of Humanities and Social Sciences currently consists of fifteen academic departments, the Bartlett College of Science and Mathematics has six departments, the College of Education and Health Sciences has five departments, and the Ricciardi College of Business has three.

=== Honors program ===
Pope Hall is the home to the residential Honors first-year living-learning community. Weygand Hall is the home to the residential Honors upperclassman living-learning community

=== Research ===
The Adrian Tinsley Program (ATP) is the university's undergraduate research program.

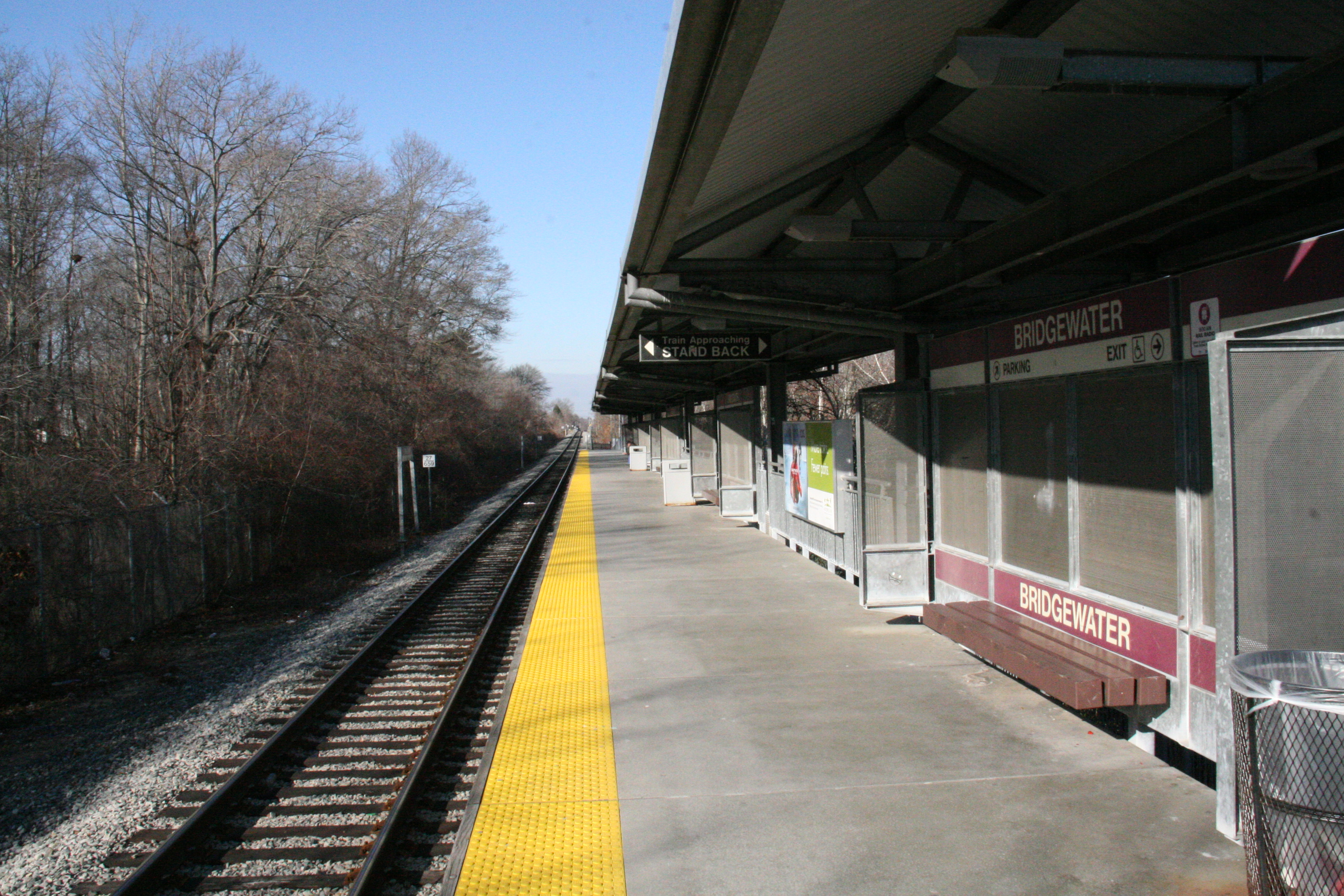
The adjacent MBTA station stop

== Residential life ==
Normal schools, because they were state institutions, received no bequests from wealthy alumni. After the Civil War, in 1869, the first college dormitory was constructed, called Normal Hall. This was a coed dormitory that was split half and half. Boys on one side, girls on the other. Students would contribute a specific amount of money for food, and the principal would then purchase supplies at the nearest wholesale. Any surplus amount of money at the end of the year was split up between those who had paid. In the 1890s this procedure was discontinued and a set price for board was established.

The 1905 yearbook titled Normal Offering readable pdf

In later years, as enrollment grew beginning in 1933, new dormitories were constructed: Woodward Hall and Tillinghast. In the post-war period, more dormitories were built: Pope Hall, Scott Hall, Durgin Hall, and Shea Hall.

== Student life ==
Undergraduate demographics as of Fall 2023
Race and ethnicity	Total
White	69%
Black	11%
Hispanic	10%
Two or more races	7%
Asian	2%
Unknown	1%
Economic diversity
Low-income (Note: The percentage of students who received an income-based federal Pell grant intended for low-income students.)	32%
Affluent (Note: The percentage of students who are a part of the American middle class at the bare minimum.)	68%

=== Clubs and organizations ===
Bridgewater State University has over 160 clubs and organizations.

Four sororities, three fraternities and one co-educational fraternity are offered at BSU: Alpha Sigma Tau, founded in 2014, Delta Phi Epsilon, founded on December 8, 2010, Gamma Phi Beta, founded November 22, 1987, Phi Sigma Sigma, founded in 1989, Kappa Delta Phi, founded on April 14, 1900, Phi Kappa Theta, founded in 1889, Sigma Pi, and Phi Pi Delta.

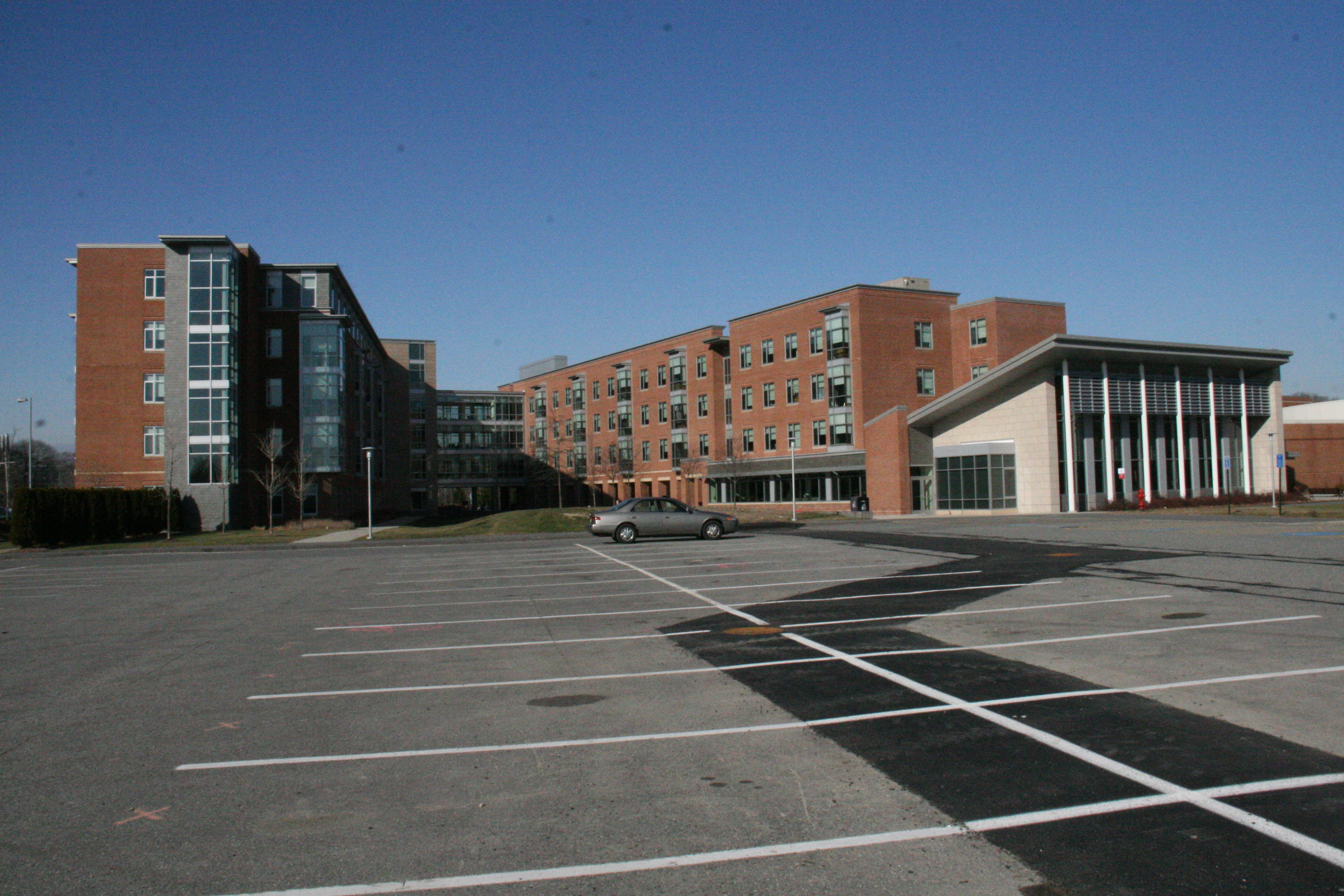
Crimson Hall

Bridgewater State's Student Government Association (SGA) is an organization of students who represent the Bridgewater State community. Through SGA, the student body can express their academic and social wants and needs. SGA is made up of five different boards: the policy board, finance board, events board, election board, and media board.

=== Student newspaper ===
The Comment had its start in 1927. At the time The Comment served "as bulletin of school affairs and to make each class better acquainted with the activities and interests of other classes." Today, The Comment has about 20 staff writers and prints nine newspapers per semester printing 1100 copies each time. It is funded by the SGA (Student Government Association). The Comment has a website that is updated daily with news about the school and sports at Bridgewater State University, but also with current news of the nation. Their main motive is to relate the stories back to Bridgewater students. With that being said, it is a common occurrence to see faces and stories of students in the newspaper. The Comment focuses on upcoming events rather than reviews to catch hold of the reader's interest.

== Athletics ==
Bridgewater State University fields 22 varsity athletic teams (10 men's 12 women's) competing at the NCAA Division III level.

== Future expansion ==
=== West Campus ===
The college had planned a $100 million renovation and expansion of the 1964 Marshall Conant Science Building (99,700 square feet (9,260 m^{2})), but the plans changed, and instead, most of the old building was demolished and replaced with a new facility, which opened in 2011.

Additions to Pope and Scott Halls opened in fall 2009, increasing their capacity by 150 beds each.

Renovations and additions to the Rondileau Campus Center (RCC) began in spring 2013 and were finished by December. The project cost the school more than $3.5 million and included lowering the main entrance on Park Avenue to street level, with the stairs being replaced by ramps for improved accessibility, installation of larger, more energy-efficient windows and doors, and interior upgrades.

In April 2014, construction began on a new Welcome Center on Plymouth Street. The building is a two-story, 15,000-square-foot facility, and it houses the undergraduate and transfer admissions offices, along with the university's financial aid offices. Construction of the Welcome Center was completed in the Spring of 2015.

Renovations and additions to Woodward Hall began in June 2014 and finished shortly before the Fall 2014 semester commenced. The renovation included the installation of new floors, ceilings and walls, along with new bedroom furniture and the installation of an elevator & entrance stairs.

=== East Campus ===
Crimson Hall, a new 400-bed residence hall on the East Campus, opened in the fall of 2007.

The college has constructed a new 600-space parking area, the Tower Lot, behind the Operations Center. The lot where the new residence hall is being built was a 1,000-spot parking lot. The new building has taken 400 of those 1,000. The Tower Lot has been built in an attempt to regain some parking spots lost during the construction. There has been a discussion of building a fine and performing arts center in the distant future.

A new residence hall, Weygand Hall, was constructed on East Campus in 2013. The building uses geothermal and solar energy to minimize energy usage.

The roughly 200-space parking lot next to the MBTA railroad underpass on East Campus has been converted into a park to balance the construction of a parking garage behind Crimson Hall. Construction on the park was completed in late 2012.

=== Cape Cod campus ===
In November 2013, the university announced plans to open a satellite campus on Cape Cod. The opening of this satellite campus helped to accommodate the high number of students who commute daily to the main campus from Cape Cod. Approximately 600 Bridgewater State students reside on or commute from Cape Cod to the main campus in Bridgewater. The campus is located in the former MacArthur School in South Yarmouth, Massachusetts. This satellite campus opened in January 2015, offering undergraduate and graduate courses in Early Childhood Education, Educational Leadership, Secondary Education, Reading, and Special Education, along with certificate programs in Business and Social Work. The campus offers a number of undergraduate credit courses in History beginning in Summer 2015.

=== Attleboro campus ===
In January 2009 a small location was opened up in Attleboro, Massachusetts. It is attached to Bristol Community College. Located at 11 Field Road, Attleboro, MA 02703

== Media ==
Bridgewater State University has a student-run radio station, 91.5 WBIM-FM.

Bridgewater State University has had its own student-run newspaper since 1927, called The Comment.

The Bridge, Bridgewater State University's student journal of literature and fine art, was established in 2004. The journal has won many national awards, including multiple Gold Crown and Gold Circle awards from the Columbia Scholastic Press Association, and the 2006 and 2011 National Pacemaker Award for collegiate magazines from the Associated Collegiate Press.

== Notable people ==
=== Alumni ===
- Sarah Louise Arnold (1859–1943), first dean of Simmons College; national president, Girl Scouts of the USA
- Clara Bancroft Beatley (1858–1923), educator, lecturer, author
- Isawa Shūji, Japanese Educator during the Meiji Period
- Stephen Canessa, (Bachelor's degree), former member of the Massachusetts House of Representatives (served 2006–2011)
- Robert Correia, (MEd 1968), member of the Massachusetts House of Representatives (served 1977–2008); former Mayor of Fall River, Massachusetts (served 2008–2010)
- Jeff Corwin, (B.S.), actor, conservationist, producer, popular TV host
- Christopher Dijak, professional wrestler currently signed to WWE's developmental brand NXT.
- Jeffrey Donovan, actor
- James H. Fagan, (B.A. 1969), member of the Massachusetts House of Representatives (1993–2011)
- Rebecca Field, part of the ensemble cast of October Road
- Mark Goddard, actor, film writer
- Lou Gorman (master's degree), former general manager of the Boston Red Sox (1988–1993)
- Jeff Gorton, general manager of the New York Rangers
- Walter Harding, (B.S.), distinguished professor, prominent scholar
- Gayle McLaughlin, Mayor of the city of Richmond, California
- Peter McNeeley, former professional heavyweight boxer
- Raymond J. McNulty, Dean of the School of Education at Southern New Hampshire University
- Paul Melicharek, PIFL football player for the Lehigh Valley Steelhawks
- Joan Menard, former member of the Massachusetts Senate (served 1999–2011); former member of the Massachusetts House of Representatives (served 1979–1999)
- Debbie Mueller, only American winner of the Dublin Marathon, 1984 winner of Twin Cities Marathon, pioneer of woman's road racing, BSU Hall of Fame inductee of 1989
- Andrae Murphy, American football player and coach
- Cristina Nardozzi, Miss Massachusetts USA 2005
- Warren G. Phillips (B.A., M.A. in Teaching Physical Sciences, M.Ed. in Instructional Technology), teacher, inducted into the National Teachers Hall of Fame 2010
- Martin V. Pratt, member of the Wisconsin State Assembly
- Chris Sparling, screenwriter and director
- Frank Palmer Speare (1889), first president of Northeastern University
- M. Estella Sprague (1887), professor and dean of home economics at the University of Connecticut
- Robert Stack, actor and former host of Unsolved Mysteries
- Ken Stone, professional mixed martial artist
- David B. Sullivan, (MEd), member of the Massachusetts House of Representatives (served 1997–2013)
- Karl Wiedergott, voice actor on The Simpsons
- Jordon Hudson, companion to Bill Belichick

=== Faculty ===
- John Bardo, educator, President of Wichita State University, Chancellor of Western Carolina University.
- Richard T. Moore, Massachusetts state senator
