= Adrian Tinsley =

American academic

Adrian Tinsley is an American academic. She was President of Bridgewater State College from 1989 until 2002 and was their first female President.

Tinsley was born in New York.

== Education ==
Tinsley was an honors graduate of Bryn Mawr College (1958, psychology) and earned a master’s degree from the University of Washington (1962) and a Ph.D. from Cornell University (1969), both English literature.

== Career ==
Tinsley began her teaching career at Cornell before going on to the University of Maryland where she developed the first women’s studies program.

At the Grand Valley State Colleges in Michigan, she was the founding dean and a faculty member at William James College.

When she became President at Bridgewater State, Tinsley began reorganizing the College so there would be individual schools with their own deans. The 1990-1991 academic year was the first for the School of Arts and Sciences and the School of Education and Allied Studies followed by the School of Managements and Aviation Science.
