= Luther Whiting Mason =

American music educator

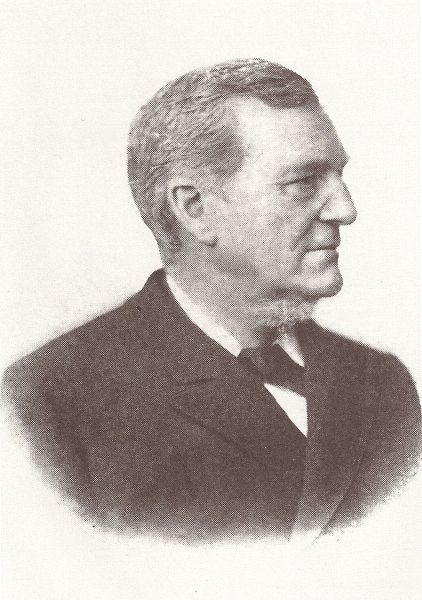
- Born: April 3, 1818; Turner, Maine, United States
- Died: July 14, 1896 (aged 78); Buckfield, Maine, United States
- Occupations: musician, educator. Foreign advisor to Meiji Japan United States
- Known for: musical education

Luther Whiting Mason (3 April 1818 – 14 July 1896) was an American music educator who was hired by the Meiji period government of Japan as a foreign advisor to introduce Western music, specifically singing, into the Japanese educational curriculum.

== Biography ==
Mason was born in Turner, Maine. He worked as a music teacher for many years, in Louisville (1852–55), followed by Cincinnati, Ohio (1856–64), and Boston, Massachusetts (1864–79). In addition to teaching, Mason collected songs, wrote textbooks, and promoted their publication. His teaching method made use of charts and what he called "ladders," to explain scales, staffs, clefs, note values, intervals, and dynamics.

While in Boston, he was scouted by the Japanese Ministry of Education on the recommendation of one of his former students, Isawa Shuji in 1872.

During his work in Japan with the Ministry of Education's Music Investigation Committee from 1880-1882, Mason collaborated with Isawa to develop programs for the teaching of music in elementary and middle schools, developing teacher training programs, and creating the first graded series of music textbooks in Japan. He also laid the foundation for a national music conservatory, the Tokyo Ongaku Gakkō, now part of the Tokyo University of the Arts. He also imported pianos and other western orchestral instruments, and made efforts to "improve" Japanese musical taste by encouraging study of harmony and popular western tunes.

Although Mason expressed a strong desire to remain in Japan, his contract was not renewed, largely due to budgetary reasons.

Mason later made four trips to Europe, visiting Germany, France, Italy, Spain, Norway, Sweden and England, observing teaching methods and collecting hundreds of music books.

Mason died in Buckfield, Maine on 14 July 1896 at the age of 78.
