= Đan Trường =

Vietnamese male singer and actor (born 1976)

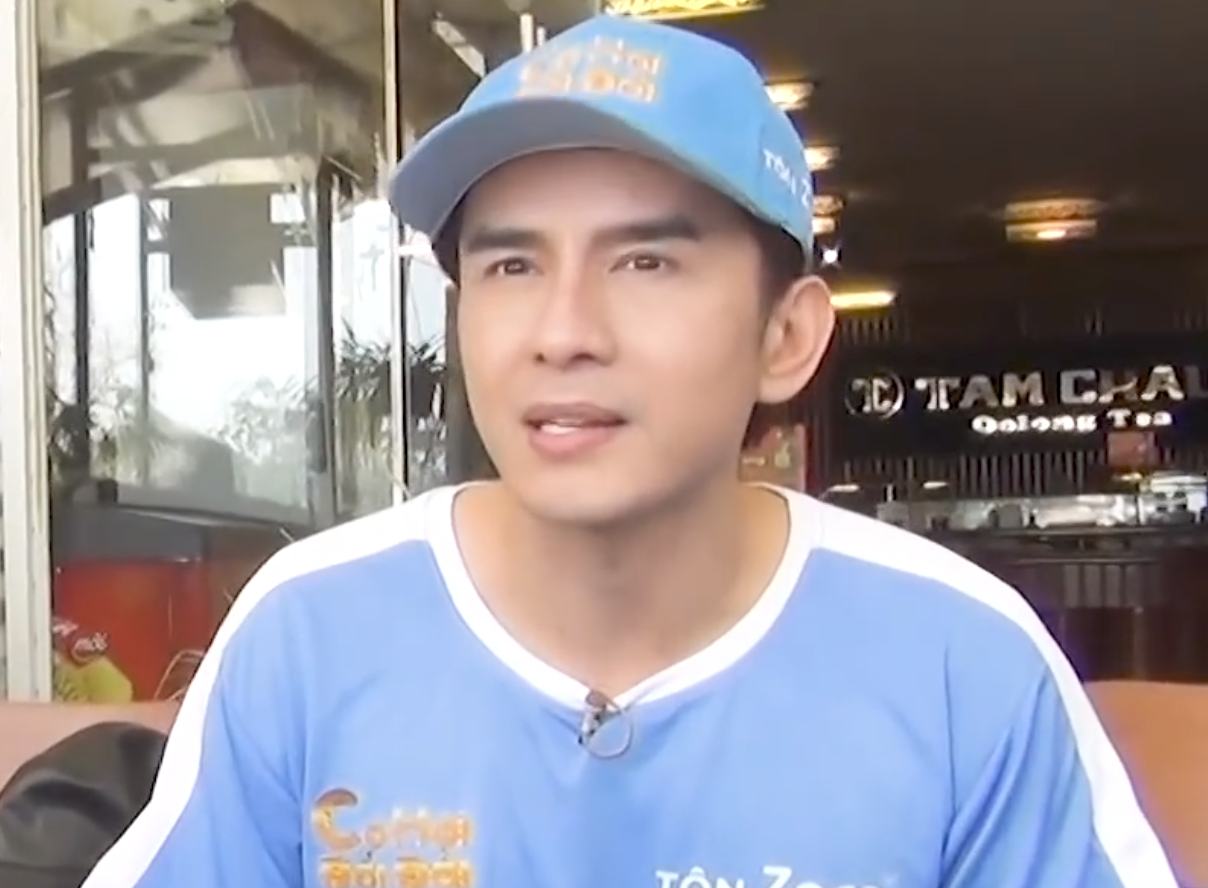
- Đan Trường in 2021

Background information
- Born: Phạm Đan Trường; 29 November 1976 (age 49); Ho Chi Minh City, Vietnam
- Genres: Pop, dance, folk
- Occupations: Vocalist, actor, youtuber
- Years active: 1997–present
- Label: HT Production
- Website: Dantruong.com.vn

Phạm Đan Trường (born 29 November 1976) is a Vietnamese singer and actor. He is known for pop, dance and folk songs.

== Biography ==
=== Early years ===
According to Đan Trường's confession in 2023 TV show Meeting at Weekend (Note: Cuộc Hẹn Cuối Tuần Số 13 Full | Đan Trường mong con trai "không gồng mình, sống khép kín như ba" on YouTube), his hometown in Hải Phòng, where his parents left in 1954. They are workers of a factory in the center of Saigon. They are Catholic. (Note: Vietnamese singer Đan Trường sings Psalm at Lenten Retreat Mass on YouTube) Đan Trường is the youngest and also the only son in a family with many daughters. According to him, the nickname Mr. Bo (anh Bo) was given to him by his parents to celebrate the difficult years, when the whole family had to eat adlay (Note: "Bo bo" in Vietnamese.) because of the high price of rice.

Đan Trường is passionate about singing by the influence of famous singer Lê Tuấn, who was once considered the leading music idol in Saigon throughout the 1980s with his nickname "prince of light music" (Note: Hoàng tử nhạc nhẹ.). Throughout Đan Trường's career, he is well known for his brand of brushed hair style, which has been associated with Lê Tuấn. Besides, like Mr. Đàm, Đan Trường always loves to use white costumes and accessories every time he goes on stage, which is often considered by the press to be influenced by the style of the church symphonies.

Phạm Đan Trường has been a professional singer since 1996. According to the general trend of the contemporary young vocalists, Đan Trường initially joined the company of manager Thủy Nguyễn (Note: A reputable businesswoman in the Vietnam entertainment world in the 1990s for helping many young singers become famous.), but quickly disappointed because he did not have many opportunities to perform. Their contract has reached the end after only six months. By memories of him, at that time he was depressed, so he intended to go to Phnom Penh to find any job.

However, during the time Đan Trường worked as a carpenter at a furniture workshop near his home, he registered to attend a singing competition. After winning 2nd prize at a talent show "The Voice of District 10", Ho Chi Minh City, in 1997, he signed an exclusive contract with HT Production of manager Tuấn Thaso (real name Hoàng Tuấn) and became known for Chinese music-Vietnamese lyric songs. The most popular one of them is "Kiep Ve Sau" and "Di Ve Noi Xa" of the same album that was released at the end of 1999. This song won him the Favorite Artist award of Green Wave Awards.

=== Peak years ===
In 2000s, he released many albums that gained much commercial success: Bong Dang Thien Than (2000), Loi Ru Tinh (2001), Trai Tim Binh Yen - Dong Song Bang (2002), Giac Mo Mau Xanh (2003), Den 1 Luc Nao Do (2004), Thap Nhi My Nhan (2007). He is the first Vietnamese artist to buy exclusive copyrights of songs to build his image and music style. He is successful in many genres, including canto-pop, pop ballads, traditional and folk songs.

During his career, he has won many music awards. He is the first to receive Artist of The Year award and Favorite Artist award for seven times in a row from Green Wave Awards, 6 Golden Blossom Awards, Favorite Male Artist Award for 3 times in a row of HTV Awards before withdrawing. He also won other awards such as: Ngoi Sao Bach Kim (Platinum Star), VTV - Bai Hat Toi Yeu (VTV - My Favorite Song) and Zing Music Awards, as well as being nominated for Singer of The Year Award at Music Dedication Award. He is also the representative of Vietnam for Asian Pop Music Concert 2016 in South Korea. He is also the coach and judge of many reality television shows, including Ngoi Sao Phuong Nam (Star of the South), Than Tuong Bolero (Bolero Idol), Tuyet Dinh Song Ca (Extreme Duet). He is also an actor and has starred in movies including Vo Lam Truyen Ky (2007), Thu Ba Hoc Tro (2009) and Yeu Anh! Em Dam Khong? (2013). He was chosen as "Taiwan Tourism Representative" (2005) by the Tourism Bureau of Taiwan and "Holland Tourism Ambassador of Vietnam" (2007).

=== Following years ===
Phạm Đan Trường married Trịnh Thủy Tiên - a Vietnamese-American businesswoman (born 1986) - in 2013. They have a son, Mathis Phạm Thiên Từ. Some time after Đan Trường and his spouse divorced (2021), he decided to gradually limit his performance time to take care of his son. He shared moments with his son on YouTube, causing Mathis to be considered the youngest YouTuber. In 2022, the video group had an appearance of Đan Trường and his son voted as the best content to save the soul during the COVID-19 pandemic in Vietnam.

In 2024, Đan Trường was criticized by netizens for abusing AI to produce a music video, which made his face look younger than his real age.

== Discography ==
=== Live shows ===
1. Cảm ơn cuộc đời (Thanks for my life) - 2000, 2001
2. Giữ mãi niềm tin (Keep me in love) - 2002
3. Trái tim bình yên (My peace love) - 2003
4. Mãi mãi một tình yêu (Love forever) - 2004
5. 10 năm 1 chặng đường (10 years 1 life) - 2006
6. Thập đại mỹ nhân - 2008
7. Ngôi sao bay (The star fly) - 2010
8. Đêm nhạc Thiên đường vắng - 2011
9. Kỷ niệm 15 năm ca hát - Con sóng yêu thương (Waves love) - 2012
10. Đêm nhạc Ngày và đêm - 2013
11. Vẫn mãi một nụ cười (Smile forever) - 2014
12. Dấu Ấn - 2014
13. Kỷ niệm 20 năm ca hát - Cảm Ơn Đời - 2016

=== Studio albums ===
- Vol.1 - Album nhạc tuyển Đan Trường (1999)
- Vol.2 - Đi về nơi xa (1999)
- Vol.3 - Bóng dáng thiên thần (2000)
- Vol.4 - Best Collection (2000)
- Vol.5 - The Best of Đan Trường (2001)
- Vol.6 - Lời ru tình (2002)
- Vol.7 - Best Collection (2002)
- Vol.8 - Trái tim bình yên - Dòng sông băng (2003)
- Vol.9 - Giấc mơ màu xanh (2003)
- Vol.10 - The Best of Đan Trường - Đánh mất giấc mơ (2003)
- Vol.11 - Đến một lúc nào đó (2004)
- Vol.12 - Bông hồng cài áo (2005)
- Vol.13 - Anh phải làm sao (2005)
- Vol.14 - Thương thầm (2005)
- Vol.15 - Lời nguyện cầu tình yêu (2006)
- Vol.16 - Bài ca Mi Ya Hee (2006)
- Vol.17 - Đơn ca Đan Trường - Anh vẫn đợi chờ (2007)
- Vol.17 - Song ca Đan Trường - Thập nhị mỹ nhân (2007)
- Vol.18 - Dây đủng đỉnh buồn (2008)
- Vol.19 - Thiên sứ tình yêu (2008)
- Vol.20 - Ngôi sao bay (2009)
- Vol.21 - Ướt lem chữ đời (2009)
- Vol.22 - Người Miền Tây (2010)
- Vol.23 - Thiên Đường Vắng (2010)
- Vol.24 - Lỡ duyên rồi (2011)
- Vol.25 - Tuyết mùa hè (2011)
- Vol.26 - Thư pháp (2012)
- Vol.27 - Người Hai Quê (2012)
- Vol.28 - Ngày và Đêm (2013)
- Vol.29 - Lục Tỉnh Miền Tây (2013)
- Vol 30 - Người Thay Thế (2014)
- Vol 31 - Nhìn Vào Nỗi Nhớ - Chàng Ốc Tương Tư (2015)
- Vol 32 - Nồi Đất (2015)
- Vol 33 - Yêu Nhau Bao Lâu (2016)

=== Singles ===
- Trái tim bình yên (2002)
- Gửi lại mùa xuân (2002)
- Trương Chi Mỵ Nương (2004)
- Ở nơi đó em cười (2006)
- Một ngày đi qua - The Best of Lê Quang (2007)
- The Best of Remix (2007)
- Hùng thiêng Âu Lạc (2010)
- Album Đan Trường - Lời Tiên Tri - Single (2014)
- Album Đan Trường - Hết Hy Vọng - Single (2015)

== Filmography ==
- Vua hóa cò (Stork the Prince) : Video drama by Trẻ Film Studio.
- Hoàng tử chăn lợn (Porker the Prince) : Video drama by Trẻ Film Studio.
- Võ lâm truyền kỳ (Once Upon a Time in a Game) : Movie by Phuoc Sang Films.
- Thứ ba học trò (Third are... Students)
- Nụ hôn đầu xuân (Early Spring Kiss)
- Iêu ah! Em zám hok? (Love Me! Do You Dare?)
- Cha ma (Papa is a Ghost)
- Ngốc ơi tuổi 17 (17 the Foolish Age)
- Gặp lại chị bầu (That Maiden was Pregnant)

== TV shows ==
- Ca sĩ giấu mặt
- Cuộc hẹn cuối tuần
- Gala cười
- Ký ức vui vẻ
- Song ca cùng thần tượng
- [...]

== See also ==
- List of Vietnamese people
- Music of Vietnam
