= Isawa Shūji =

Japanese educator and bureaucrat

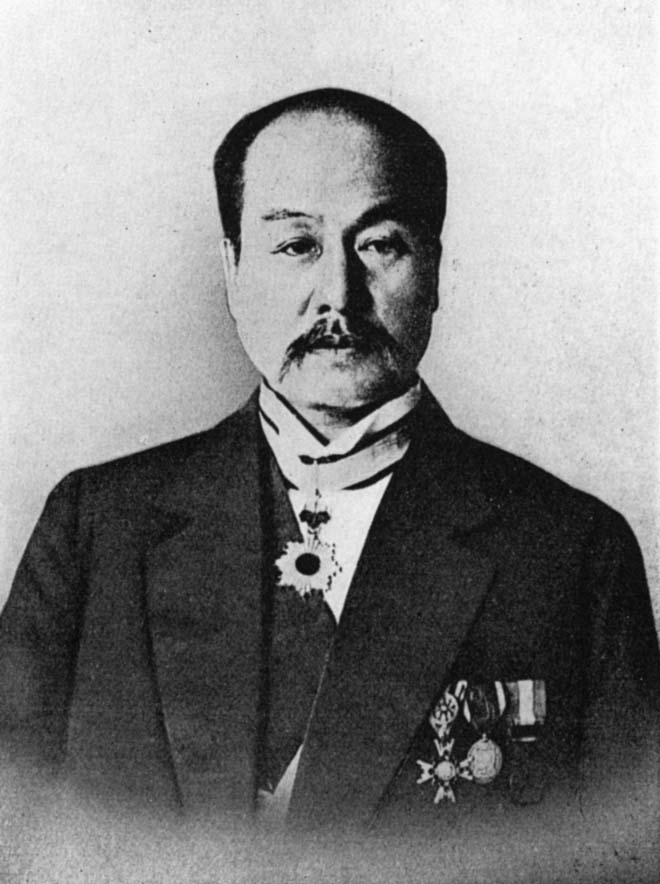
- Born: 30 June 1851; Shinano province, Japan
- Died: 3 May 1917 (aged 65)
- Occupation: Educator
- Known for: Establishing various universities

Isawa Shūji (伊澤 修二; 30 June 1851 – 3 May 1917) was a Japanese educator of the Meiji period.

== Biography ==
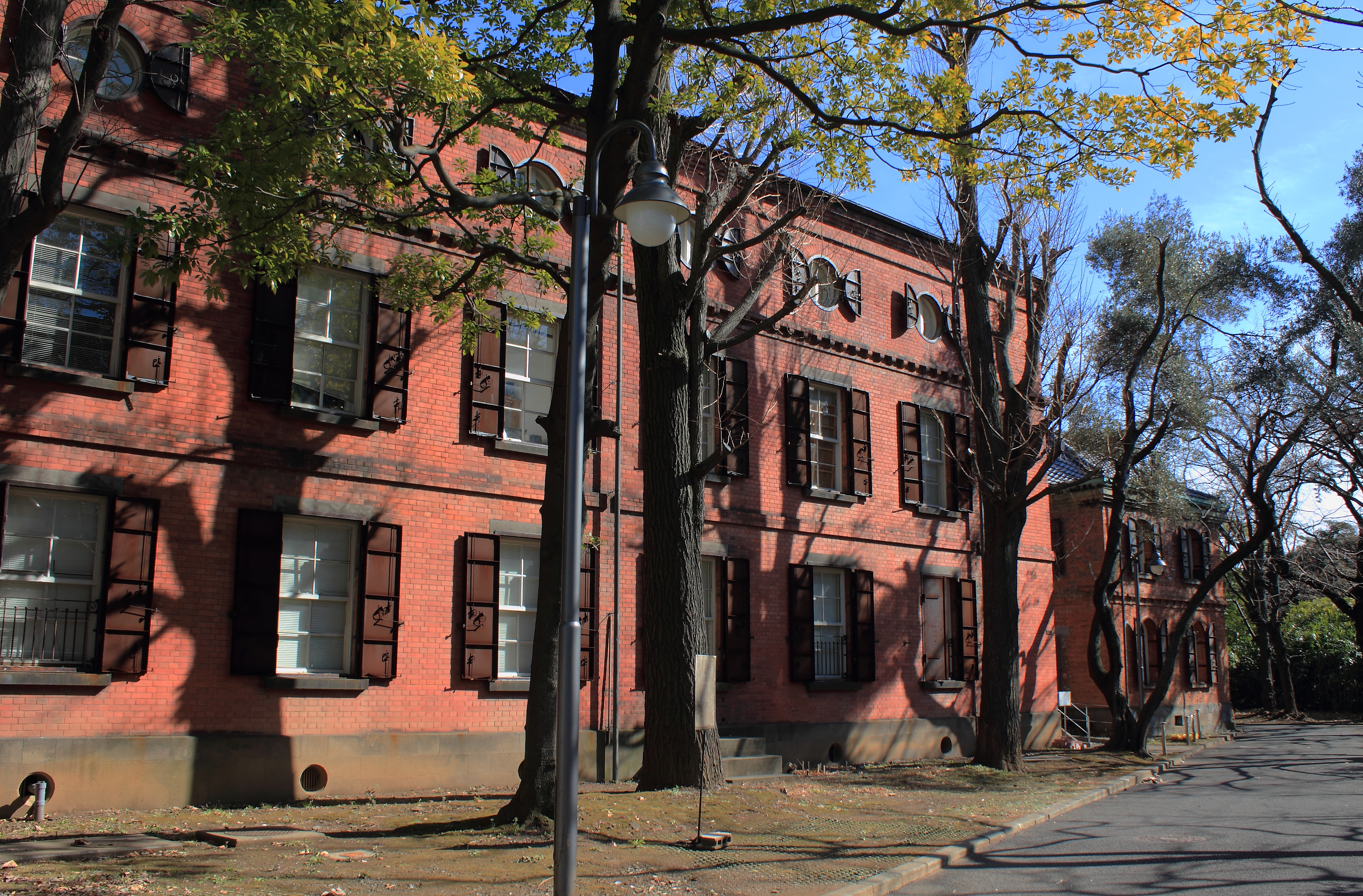
Tokyo University of the Arts, a school which Isawa Shuji helped establish

Isawa Shūji was born in 1851 in the Takatō Domain, Shinano Province, to an impoverished samurai family. Shūji's father, Isawa Katsusaburō (伊澤勝三郎, also known as Bunkoku 文谷), was a fairly low-ranking samurai secretary for the Takatō Domain, and was also an amateur artist. Shūji's mother was Uchida Take (内田多計).

As a teenager, Isawa took part in the recently formed Dutch-style military drum and fife marching band in the Takatō Domain. He also studied at the Takato Domain school, Shintokukan (進徳館).

In 1869, Isawa Shūji moved to Tōkyō to reside with his uncle, the renowned physician Suda Tairei (須田泰嶺). While in Tōkyō, Isawa briefly studied English privately with the missionary Christopher Carrothers and also with Nakahama Manjirō, and in 1870 Isawa was selected to represent the Takatō Domain as a student at the newly formed Daigaku Nankō (predecessor of the University of Tokyo).

In 1872, Isawa began working for the Japanese Ministry of Education and was dispatched to Aichi, where he served as the director of a teachers college. However, he was terminated from his ministry position after a dispute. In 1873 he began working for the Ministry of Industry (Japan), but in 1874 he was allowed to return to the Ministry of Education.

In 1874, Isawa married Mori Chiyo (森千代), the daughter of a former Tokushima Domain samurai.

=== American Studies ===
In 1875 Isawa was sent to the United States to study teacher training at the State Normal School at Bridgewater, Massachusetts (now Bridgewater State University). While visiting Boston, Isawa had a chance encounter with the American music educator Luther Whiting Mason, which led to private music study with Mason. Several years later, upon the joint recommendation of Isawa and his immediate supervisor in the Ministry of Education, Mason was invited to Japan to work with Isawa toward the development of the first Japanese school music curriculum.

Isawa also studied English pronunciation and phonetics privately with Alexander Graham Bell, and taught Japanese to Bell. In addition, Isawa studied briefly at Harvard University before having to return to Japan upon his father's death.

=== Isawa and the Telephone ===
Sometime prior to January 20, 1877, Isawa became the first person to use a language other than English on the telephone. According to Bell, the telephone's inventor, "a young Japanese student named Isawa...came to me for the purpose of studying the pronunciation of English. Of course, when he heard about the telephone he became very much interested. He said, 'Mr. Bell, will this thing talk Japanese?' I said, 'Certainly, any language.' He seemed very much astonished at that, and said he would like to try it. Mr. Isawa went to one end of the circuit and I stood at the other. He talked in Japanese and I reported the result to him". Isawa brought future statesmen Kaneko Kentaro and Komura Jutarō to also use the telephone.

=== Return to Japan ===
Isawa returned to Japan to head the Tokyo Normal School (now University of Tsukuba) in 1879. He was also involved in the development of the Tokyo School for the Deaf in 1880, the Tokyo School of Music (now Tokyo University of the Arts) in 1887, and the Taiwanese public school system in 1895.

From the outset, it was never Isawa's intention to adopt Western music wholesale for use in the Japanese public schools, but rather to arrive at what he himself called a "compromise" between Western and Japanese music, the theory behind which had been culled from various European and American pedagogical treatises, and from Isawa's experiences in the United States, and which was also influenced to some degree by Christian church music that had entered Japan in the early Meiji era. Over time, Isawa's ideas about the goals of music education shifted. Initially, Isawa was chiefly concerned with what he saw as the psychological and physical merits of music education for young children. Gradually, however, he became interested in the use of music to promote character formation, and later he overtly emphasized the importance of moral education via music.

A prolific writer and wide-ranging thinker, Isawa is also credited with some of the earliest works in Japanese on pedagogical theory and practice, education of the deaf, linguistics, and evolutionary biology.

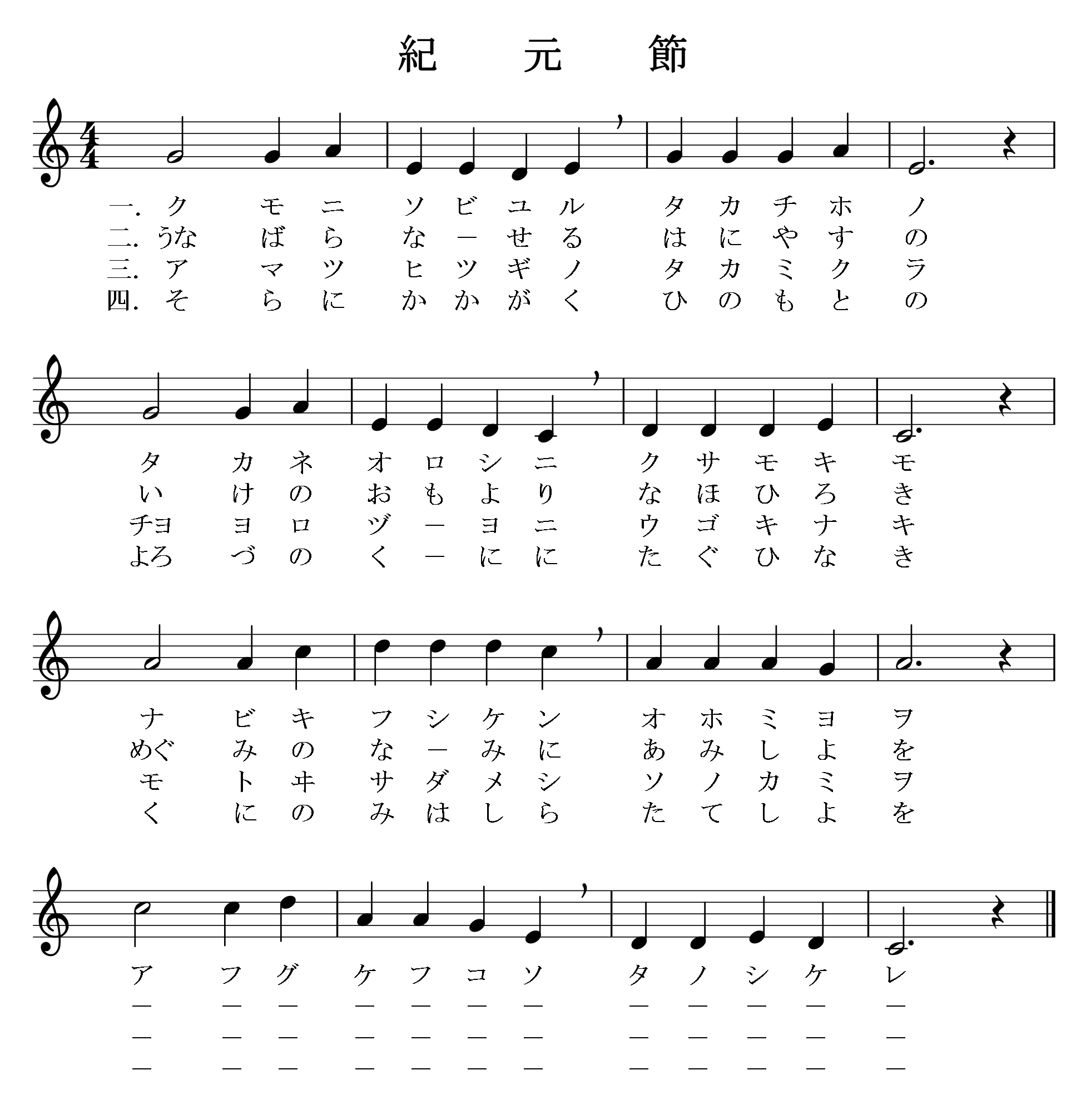
A music score composed by Isawa Shūji

=== Spelling ===
The family name should be spelled Isawa, with an "s", and not Izawa. All period documents about Isawa Shūji written in Romanization—those in Isawa's own hand as well as official documents maintained at Bridgewater Normal School and from his time at Harvard University—consistently give the spelling as Isawa, not as Izawa. Music scores from the period also attest to the correct spelling: Isawa. Isawa's family roots are said to be near the village of Isawa, Kai Province, located in the present-day Higashiyatsushiro District, Yamanashi Prefecture, Japan. His ancestors had been warriors for the Takeda clan at Isawa, Kai, but they fled to the Takato Domain after the fall of the Takedas.

In addition, Shūji himself sometimes spelled his given name "Shuje" during his stay in the USA, as can be seen in various documents housed in the Isawa Shuji Collection at Bridgewater State University.

In writing his own family name in Japanese, Isawa consistently used the traditional and more complex form of the character for -sawa (澤), and not the simplified form (沢).

Later in life, Isawa adopted the pen name Rakuseki (楽石).
