= Hidden character =

Hidden character may refer to:

- A non-printing character in computer-based text processing and digital typesetting
- A secret character (video games) in video games
- An unseen character in fiction
- Hidden character stone
