= Thích Thiên-Ân =

Buddhist monk (1926–1980)

Thiên Ân
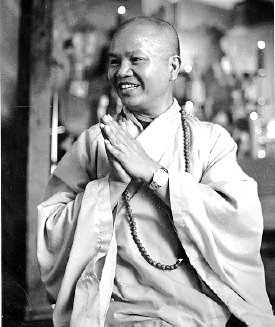
- Ven. Dr. Thich Thien-An
- Title: Thich; Dr.

Personal life
- Born: September 22, 1925 Phú Vang District, Thừa Thiên-Huế Province, Vietnam
- Died: November 23, 1980 (aged 55) Los Angeles, California, U.S.

Religious life
- Religion: Buddhism
- School: Vietnamese Zen

Senior posting
- Students: Karuna Dharma

Thích Thiên-Ân (釋天恩) (September 22, 1925—November 23, 1980) was an American teacher and Buddhist monk of Vietnamese Thiền (Zen) Buddhism and was active in the United States from 1966 to 1980. He was ordained at Chua Chau Lam in Hue, Vietnam.

Thích Thiên-Ân came to the United States from Vietnam in the summer of 1966 as an exchange professor. He taught philosophy at the University of California, Los Angeles. After discovering he was not only a renowned scholar but a Zen Buddhist monk as well, his students convinced him to teach Zen meditation and to start a Buddhist study group on the UCLA campus.

A few years later, his enthusiastic students encouraged Thích Thiên-Ân to apply for permanent residence and open a meditation center that included a place for practitioners to live and study Zen Buddhism. In 1970, he founded the International Buddhist Meditation Center in the Koreatown section of Los Angeles, California .

Once established, Thích Thiên-Ân taught the traditions of Zen Buddhism at his center. In addition, he taught Eastern Philosophy and Asian Studies at Los Angeles City College. He retired from teaching at the college when he was diagnosed with liver cancer in 1979. He continued teaching at his center until he died in 1980 at the age of 54, succumbing to the effects of the liver cancer.

The International Buddhist Meditation Center he founded continues to thrive.

Thích Thiên-Ân authored the following books: Zen Philosophy, Zen Practice (ISBN 0-913546-33-X);and Buddhism and Zen in Vietnam copyright 1975 (ISBN 0-8048-1144-X).

== Quotes ==
- "We all shed salty tears and shed red blood. All is one."
