= Karuna Dharma =

American Buddhist scholar and nun (1940–2014)

- Title: Bhikkhuni

Personal life
- Born: Joyce Adele Pettingill; April 21, 1940 Beloit, Wisconsin
- Died: February 22, 2014 (aged 73)

Religious life
- Religion: Buddhism
- School: Vietnamese Thiền

Senior posting
- Teacher: Thích Thiên-Ân

Karuna Dharma (Vietnamese: Thích Nữ Ân Từ; April 21, 1940—February 22, 2014) was an American Buddhist scholar and nun. She was the first American-born woman to become a fully ordained Buddhist nun in the Vietnamese tradition. She was the abbess of the International Buddhist Meditation Center of Los Angeles.

== Biography ==
Karuna Dharma was born Joyce Adele Pettingill on April 21, 1940, in Beloit, Wisconsin, to a Baptist family. She attended the University of Wisconsin–Madison where she met Ben Ting Fun Lum. They married and moved to Los Angeles where he was an aerospace engineer for McDonnell Douglas.

She met Vietnamese Zen Buddhist master Thích Thiên-Ân in 1969 when she signed up for a class on Buddhism. She was one of his first students. She helped him establish the International Buddhist Meditation Center (IBMC) in 1970. She took full ordination in the Lieu Quang school of Vietnamese Thiền from Thích Thiên-Ân in 1976. This made her the first fully ordained female member of the Buddhist monastic community in the U.S. Following Thích Thiên-Ân's death in 1980, she succeeded him in directing the International Buddhist Meditation Center.

Karuna Dharma used the International Buddhist Meditation Center to assist Vietnamese refugees and was greatly influential in their resettlement in the United States following the Vietnam War. Dharma interpreted the Prātimokṣa's prohibition on sexual misconduct as not applying to people in a committed relationship. She estimated at one point that one third of the community at IBMC was lesbian or gay.

During Venerable Karuna Dharma's lifetime, she ordained nearly 50 bhikkhunis and hundreds of Buddhist clergy and laity. She served as president of the American Buddhist Congress and vice president of the College of Buddhist Studies and the Buddhist Sangha Council of Southern California. She founded Sakyadhita, the Buddhist-Catholic dialog, the Buddhist Sangha Council of SoCal, and the Inter-religious Council of SoCal.

She had two daughters, Chrystine and Elan from a previous marriage prior to ordaining as a nun. Venerable Karuna Dharma died on February 22, 2014, from complications of Alzheimer's disease.
