= Thích Minh Tuệ =

Travelling Vietnamese ascetic

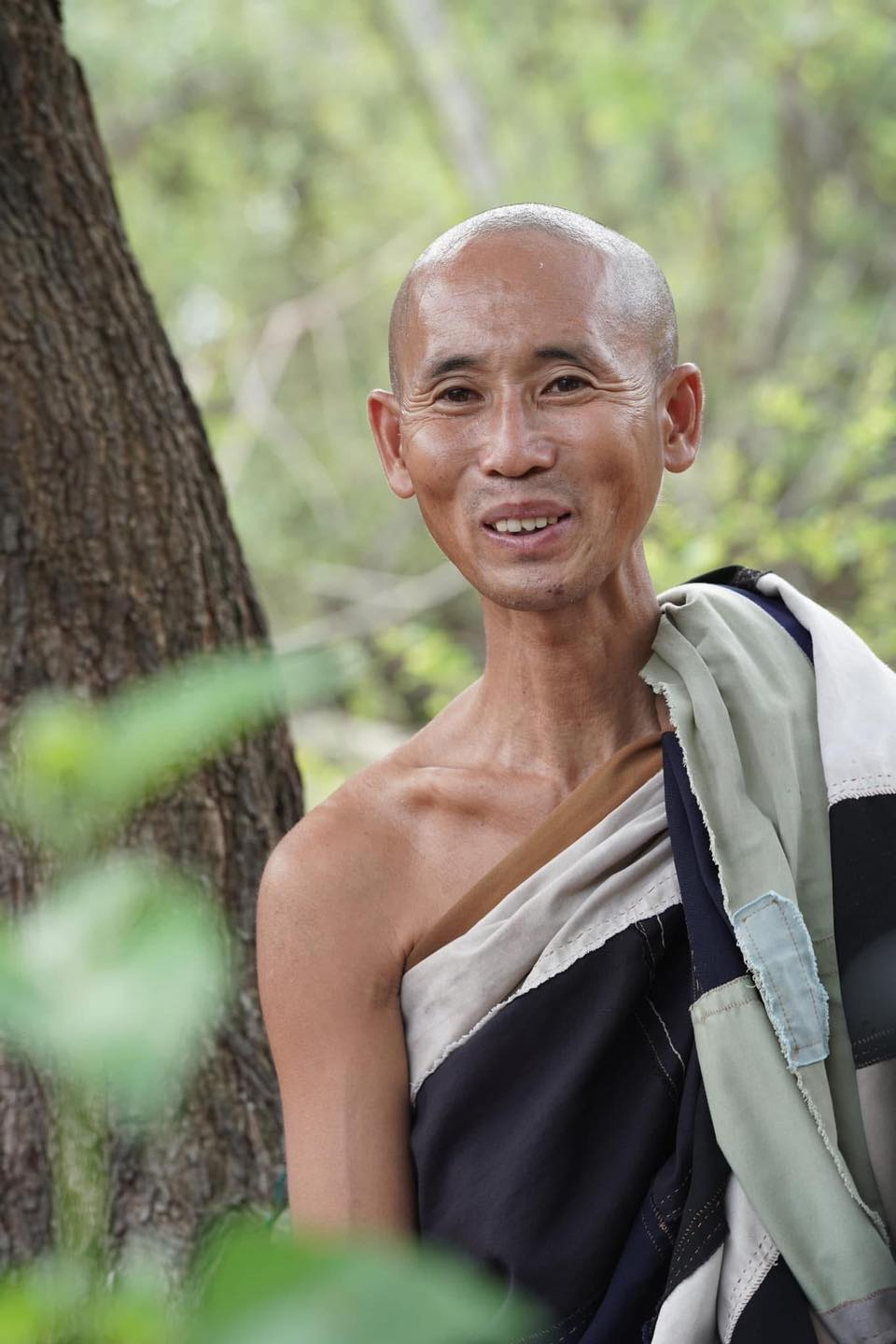
- Thich Minh Tue in Malaysia, March 2025

Personal life
- Born: Lê Anh Tú; 1981 (age 44–45) Kỳ Anh district, Hà Tĩnh province
- Occupation: Mendicant

Religious life
- Religion: Buddhism
- Temple: No fixed place
- Institute: No fixed place
- School: Primitive Buddhism
- Sect: Dhutanga
- Dharma name: Minh Tuệ

Thích Minh Tuệ (born 1981), birth name Lê Anh Tú is a Vietnamese Buddhist mendicant monk and Dhutanga practitioner. After briefly practicing at a pagoda after giving up his job as a land surveyor, Thich Minh Tue decided to "learn and follow the Buddha's teachings" by observing the 13 ascetic practices of Primitive Buddhism and walking for alms across the country for many years. His 2024 walking journey attracted the attention of the Vietnamese public, with thousands meeting him and at times up to hundreds following him, leading to many social and security disturbances, and turning him into an "unwilling" Internet celebrity. Although Thích Minh Tuệ does not see himself as a monk, his simple, ascetic lifestyle has led many to view him as one. Walking barefoot across Vietnam with few possessions, he embodies the spirit of renunciation and mindfulness. To his followers and many in the public, he represents a return to the core values of Buddhism—compassion, humility, and inner peace—challenging traditional definitions of monastic life. His legitimacy is also a widely discussed topic. The state-controlled Vietnam Buddhist Sangha does not accept calling him a "Buddhist monk", but the Unified Buddhist Sangha of Vietnam recognizes this and praises him for having the virtues to qualify for that title. Agreeing with calling Thich Minh Tue a monk, observers say that determining whether an individual is a monk or not does not depend on the consent of any organization.

In early June 2024, Vietnamese authorities forcibly dispersed Thích Minh Tuệ and his group of followers, who were practicing asceticism. Following this, Thích Minh Tuệ went into seclusion, and restrictions were imposed on others attempting to join or emulate his ascetic practices. These actions have sparked significant concerns among international human rights organizations regarding the state of religious freedom in Vietnam. Thich Minh Tue began his barefoot pilgrimage to India on December 12, 2024, walking with several mendicants through Laos, Thailand, Malaysia, Sri Lanka, India and Nepal after consulting with individuals familiar with administrative procedures. Thích Minh Tuệ has been accompanied by a retired Vietnamese police officer, appointed by authorities as his "bodyguard", whose tight control over logistics and media, including restricting journalists’ access and questions, has sparked criticism for suppressing his influence.

== Biography ==
Lê Anh Tú was born in 1981 in Ky Van commune, Ky Anh district, Ha Tinh province, Vietnam. He was the second child in a family of four children. In 1994, he moved with his family to Ia To commune, Ia Grai district, Gia Lai province.

In Gia Lai, after completing high school, he served in the military for three years. After demobilization, he attended the Tay Nguyen College of Forestry; after graduating, he worked as a land surveyor for a private company based in Gia Lai province.

In 2015, Le Anh Tu decided to leave the secular world and become a monk, taking the dharma name Thích Minh Tuệ, or shortly Minh Tuệ. He then left the monastery and went into solitary retreat in the mountains, living in a cave and begging for food daily. From 2018 to 2023, Minh Tue embarked on three walking pilgrimages as part of his "Dhutanga" practice, but these went nearly unnoticed, although there are some videos about him leaked on YouTube. His fourth pilgrimage in 2024, however, drew widespread attention, with crowds of up to thousands of people following him on his journey. He ended his alms-begging pilgrimage in early June of the following year after discussions with Vietnamese authorities.

VnExpress quoted Thích Minh Tuệ as saying that he has never claimed to be a monk and he himself also "feels unworthy of being a monk because his morality has not yet reached that level". The Vietnam Buddhist Sangha also affirmed that he is not a Buddhist monk, does not practice, and is not a staff member of any temple or monastery of the Vietnam Buddhist Sangha.

== Pilgrimage to India ==
He started his journey on foot to India in December 2024, traveling from Vietnam through Laos and Thailand, with plans to cross into Myanmar before continuing westward. However, he faces significant challenges, including visa issues in Thailand, extreme weather conditions, and a knee injury among his companions. The greatest obstacle is crossing into Myanmar, where ongoing conflict has made his intended route through Mae Sot dangerous, forcing him to consider an alternative entry via Shan State.

== Impact ==
Adopting the image of an anonymous person who states he is 'learning' according to Buddha's teachings and walking barefoot across the country, Thích Minh Tuệ has become an internet phenomenon in Vietnam. Some people have also used his image on social media to increase interaction for online businesses. Even on e-commerce platforms and social networks, there have been clothes and accessories designed in the colors of his attire. His personal activities such as sleeping, bathing, and using the toilet have also been disturbed. This internet phenomenon was likened to "view parties" by Dân Việt newspaper, reflecting the problem of excessive praise by content creators on digital platforms.

Vietnamese authorities fear that dissidents in the country could exploit the "Thích Minh Tuệ phenomenon" to oppose the religious policies of the Communist Party of Vietnam and the Vietnamese government on social media, arguing that opposition organizations are trying to cause "division" and "conflict" in order to weaken the "national unity bloc" and go against traditional values. Local police forces have also coordinated with relevant units to implement a number of measures to ensure traffic safety and public order when Thích Minh Tuệ walks through the provinces.

The executive board of the Vietnam Buddhist Sangha in Bà Rịa–Vũng Tàu province has disciplined Venerable Thich Minh Dao, abbot of Minh Dao Monastery, after he posted a video praising Thich Minh Tue. The executive board later concluded that Venerable Thich Minh Dao's "comments about Mr. Le Anh Tu are the right of each individual to think," but "the mistake is in using words that are not in line with his functions – authority leading to misunderstandings from many places." Father Anton Maria Vu Quoc Thinh of the Society of Jesus called to inquire about Venerable Minh Dao after hearing that he had been disciplined.

On May 30, 2024, a man following Thich Minh Tue on a pilgrimage died of heatstroke, multiple organ failure, and rhabdomyolysis. The man collapsed while traveling with Thich Minh Tue through Trieu Phong district, Quang Tri province, and was taken to a local hospital for emergency treatment, but did not survive. In the following days, several cases of heatstroke were reported. The crowds following Thich Minh Tue caused traffic congestion, refused to give way to ambulances, littered, and defecated indiscriminately, causing unsanitary conditions, according to state press.

According to information from the Committee for Religious Affairs of the Vietnamese government, Mr. Thich Minh Tue has voluntarily stopped his pilgrimage on foot since June 3, 2024. According to the leadership of the Thừa Thiên Huế Police Department, the Gia Lai Police Department has assisted in making an ID card for Mr. Le Anh Tu.

== Reception ==
Professor Dr. Nguyễn Hữu Liêm commented that the almsgiving of Buddhist monks from the past to the present is not unusual, so he also considers Thích Minh Tuệ's journey as normal. According to Venerable Thích Thanh Huân, the "Thích Minh Tuệ phenomenon" is not noteworthy. The newspaper Công Thương observed that although he does not reside in any temple and has chosen his own path for his practice, Thích Minh Tuệ has become "inadvertently famous". Without delving much into Thích Minh Tuệ's practice, the newspaper Công an nhân dân focused on criticizing the public's interest in him, calling it "a disaster born from social media addiction". Journalist Nguyễn Mạnh Hà, in an article for BBC News, commented that following Thích Minh Tuệ's journey has become a daily habit for many Vietnamese, but also noted that he is "inadvertently" taking on the role of the abbot of a "mobile temple". The news outlet also emphasized that it is Thích Minh Tuệ's "simple, rustic" words that attract the public, even though he does not deliver profound sermons.

Minh Tuệ's ascetic journey has sparked various opinions about the legitimacy of his method of practice. The newspaper Tiền Phong commented that while Thích Minh Tuệ follows the Theravada tradition, he does not belong to any religious organization or temple, and the path he has chosen is "one of the most arduous." Venerable Thích Minh Đạo believes that Thích Minh Tuệ's silent practice has "revived Vietnamese Buddhism in the hearts of Buddhists around the world," and referred to him as the embodiment of Mahakasyapa, a disciple of Buddha Shakyamuni who practiced Dhutanga his whole life. However, some in the monastic community compare him to another disciple, Devadatta, who betrayed Buddha, suggesting that the internet fame he garnered parallels the crime of disrupting unity that Devadatta committed. Monk Thích Đồng Đạo rejects calling Minh Tuệ a "monk," arguing that his way of practice represents "a transformation in mindset seeking something unique that does not conform to any traditional teaching." Meanwhile, journalist Cù Mai Công praises his method of practice as "an incredible display of determination and letting go."

Thích Minh Tuệ's fame has drawn members of the Vietnamese entertainment industry into the debate. Actress Angela Phương Trinh frequently posted critical comments about him and his followers on her social media accounts, even calling him a "villain." She is a disciple of Venerable Thích Chân Quang, the abbot of Thiền Tôn Phật Quang mega temple in Bà Rịa–Vũng Tàu province, who has also harshly criticized Thích Minh Tuệ, referring to him as a "con man." The local media criticized the actress as "overzealous," "reckless," and "lacking standards," and called on authorities to "take appropriate action," while also urging "caution against religious exploitation." She later issued an apology, deleted all comments directed at Thích Minh Tuệ, and expressed hope for public understanding, stating that she is "still on the path of learning the way."

In response to the Vietnamese Buddhist Sangha's document not recognizing Thích Minh Tuệ as a Buddhist monk, Dr. Hoàng Văn Chung, Head of the Department of Theoretical Research and Religious Policy at the Institute for Religious Studies, expressed his opinion: "As long as people believe and practice Buddhism, they have their rights. It is not necessary for them to have recognition from the Buddhist Sangha to be considered a Buddhist monk. Buddhism does not belong to anyone in particular." According to monk Thích Đồng Long from the Unified Buddhist Sangha of Vietnam, an organization not under the control of the Vietnamese government, the notion that one is not a true monk if not recognized by the Vietnamese Buddhist Sangha is "mistaken," indicating a lack of religious freedom in the country. On June 4, 2024, following reports that Thích Minh Tuệ had been forcibly stopped from his pilgrimage and taken away, the Unified Buddhist Sangha of Vietnam issued a statement affirming that he had maintained the proper conduct of a Buddhist monk and called on the Vietnamese authorities to allow him to practice his faith freely.
