= Thích Nhật Từ =

Personal life
- Born: Trần Ngọc Thảo; April 1, 1969 (age 57) Saigon, South Vietnam
- Education: D.Phil. in Philosophy
- Known for: Spirituality

Religious life
- Religion: Buddhism
- Temple: Giac Ngo Temple
- School: Mindfulness Meditation; Founder of the Buddhism Today
- Lineage: 43rd generation (Lâm Tế); 8th generation
- Website: www.buddhismtoday.com and www.chuagiacngo.com

Ven. Thich Nhat Tu or Thích Nhật Từ (釋日慈) in Vietnamese (Saigon, 1969) is a Vietnamese Buddhist monk, an author, a poet, a psychological consultant, and an active social activist in Vietnam. In addition to Buddhist and charitable activities, Thích Nhật Từ is known in the media and on social networks for controversial statements and allegations related to religious groups, and Thích Minh Tuệ's pilgrimage group. Thích Nhật Từ is also said to hold several "honorary doctorates" from various universities worldwide, some of which are considered degree mills.

== Biography ==
Ven. Thich Nhat Tu was born in 1969. After completing secondary high school, he became a novice at 13 years old, under the spiritual guidance of the late Most Ven. Thich Thien Hue at Giac Ngo Temple and received full ordination in 1988. He has been the Abbot of Giac Ngo Temple since 1992, and is the founder of Buddhism Today Foundation in 2000. He is also the Abbot of Huong Son temple (Ha Tinh), Quan Am Dong Hai temple (Soc Trang), and Giac Ngo temple (Ba Ria - Vung Tau).

In 1992 he went to India for higher education and got his MA degree in philosophy in 1997 from Delhi University and D.Phil. degree from Allahabad University in 2001, respectively.

Ven. Thich Nhat Tu has authored more than seventy books in Vietnamese and English on Buddhist philosophy and applied Buddhism. He is editor-in-chief and publisher of Buddhism Today Books Series (more than 200 volumes on different subjects have been published in Vietnamese to meet the needs of researchers and practitioners). He is also author and editor of Buddhism Today Dharma Talks Series (more than 2000 VCDs and audio CDs on Buddhamdharma as taught by Ven. Dr. Thich Nhat Tu have been produced by the Buddhism Today Association for the general public). He is editor and publisher of Buddhism Today Dharma Music Series (more than 100 CD albums have been published).

He is also editor and publisher of the Vietnamese Tripitaka in MP3 format (The recording of the Vietnamese Sutta Pitaka translated from the Pali by Thich Minh Chau and that of the Mahayana tradition translated from the Chinese by various Mahayana scholars, the Āgamas, and Vinaya Pitaka. The Abhidharma is being carried out. The first mp3 edition of Sutta Pitaka came into existence in May 2006 for celebrations of Buddha Jayanti and has been placed on one of its websites, for downloading to both Macintosh and Windows computers. It is available for free distribution and non-commercial purposes.

Since 2002, he has extensively given public Dharma talks to Vietnamese communities, domestically as well as internationally, such as America, Australia and Europe. He is organizer and moderator of A Fortnightly Retreat for about 1500 practitioners at Pho Quang Temple, HCMC.

He is also actively engaged in the inter-religious dialogue and promotion of peace and harmony. He is committed to propagate Buddhist teachings through education, cultural activities and charitable programs in order to benefit the society at large.

Ven. Dr. Thich Nhat Tu currently serves as standing vice rector of the Vietnam Buddhist University in Ho Chi Minh city, standing vice chair of the National Department of International Buddhist Affairs (National Vietnam Buddhist Sangha), vice rector of Vietnam Buddhist Research Institute, and general editor of Vietnamese Buddhist Tripitaka and editor-in-chief of Buddhism Today magazine.

== Education and conference ==
In spite of being born in the period when the country was still in difficulties with after war consequences, all Buddhist schools were forced to close, he was fortunate enough to be trained under respected Buddhist leaders in Vietnam in the 20th century, namely Thich Minh Chau, Thich Thien Sieu, Thich Duc Nghiep, etc... Thanks to their teachings and training, when still a Samanera, he was already rich in knowledge of Theravada and Mahayana sutras. He got a Bachelor of Arts in English in 1994, University of Pedagogy; Master of Philosophy in 1997, Delhi University; Doctor of Philosophy in 2001, Allahabad University.

Thich Nhat Tu has attended and contributed papers at international Buddhist conferences such as the International Conclave on Buddhism and Spiritual Tourism (New Delhi), Fo Guang Shan International Monastic Seminar (Kaohsiung), the Fourth World Buddhist Summit (Bangkok), Dharma Drum Mountain World Center for Buddhist Education Conference (Taipei), the First World Buddhist Forum (Hangzhou), the 23rd General Conference of the World Fellowship of Buddhists (Kaohsiung), the First International Buddhist Conference (Kandy), International Buddhist Conference during United Nations day of Vesak (Thailand, 2007–2013), the Asian Zen Conference (international seminar on Meditation and Zen, Hong Kong), International Conference on Dharma – Dhamma (Sanchi/ Bhopal, India), National Conference on Buddhist Education (Hanoi), the International Conference on Buddhism in the New Era (HCM), International Conference on Multi-ethnic and Multi-language Asia, and others (HCM), etc.

He was international conference coordinator of United Nations Day of Vesak conference 2008 and 2014. He was convenor of several national conference on philosophy and Buddhism co-organised by Vietnam Buddhist University, Vietnam Buddhist Research Institute and HCM University of Humanities and Social Sciences.

He has been appointed as the International Organising Committee member of the UN Day of Vesak Celebration 2006–2012 and vice chair, international secretariat of the UN Day of Vesak Celebration 2007, Bangkok, general secretary of UNDV in 2008 and again deputy general secretary of UNDV 2014 and 2019.

== Honorary doctorates ==
In appreciation of his excellent contribution to Buddhist education, his works on Buddhist academic research and leadership in international Buddhist community, several universities have conferred upon him Honorary Doctorates as follows:

- 2010: Honorary Doctor of Philosophy in Religious Studies, conferred by the Mahamakut Buddhist University, Bangkok, Thailand on October 30, 2010;
- 2016: Honorary Degree of Doctor in Philosophy, conferred by the Mahachulalongkornrajavidyalaya University, Bangkok, Thailand, on May 15, 2016.
- 2016: Honorary Degree of Doctor Letters, conferred by Apollos University, USA, on Jun 20, 2016.
- 2019: Honorary Doctor of Letters conferred by Chancellor of Swami Vivekanand Subhrati University, Meerut, India, on April 27, 2019.
- 2019: Doctor of Philosophy in Humanity Honoris Causa conferred by Rector of Preah Sihanouk Raja Buddhist University, Phnom Penh, Cambodia, on March 31, 2019.
- 2021: Honorary Doctoral of Philosophy in Morality Education conferred by President of International University of Morality, USA on Oct 14, 2021.
- 2022: Honorary Doctor Degree of Literature (Sahithya Chakrawarthi) conferred by Chancellor of Buddhist and Pali University of Sri Lanka, on April 6, 2022; Ref. BPU/ASS-04/Con.12/2021.

== International Awards and Recognitions ==
- 2013: African Award for Leadership Excellence conferred by chairman of the board of Buddhist Federation of African, on October 13, 2013.
- 2015: Saddhammajotikadhaja Title conferred by Government of Myanmar, Yangon, Myanmar, on March 4, 2015.
- 2015: The World Buddhist Outstanding Leader Award conferred by Acting Supreme Patriarch of Thailand, President of the Supreme Sangha Council, Bangkok, Thailand, on March 5, 2015.
- 2017: Global Buddhist Reformer Award conferred by President of World Alliance of Buddhist Leaders, Malaysia, July 22, 2017.
- 2017: Global Buddhist Ambassador Award conferred by H.E. Loknayak Ashva Ghosh Mahanayaka, Chairman of Manak International Institute of Buddhist Studies, Bangkok, February 12, 2017.
- 2018: Global Mentor Award conferred by Chancellor of Swami Vivekanand Subhrati University, Meerut, India, July 30, 2018.
- 2019: International Research and Education Award conferred by president of Asian Association for the Study of Culture and Religion of, March 31, 2019.
- 2019: International education Award conferred by president of Nepal Traditional Buddhist Association, Lumbini, February 28, 2019.
- 2019: Saddharma Keerthi Sri Darshana Visharada Award conferred by Sangharaja of Parama Dhamma Chetiya Pirivena Ratmalana, Colombo, Sri Lanka, July 16, 2019
- 2019: Suvanna Pathom Chedi Award given by National Office of Buddhism, Thailand conferred by Somdej Phra Ariyavongsagatanana, Sangharaja, Supreme Patriarch of Thailand, August 4, 2019
- 2019: Outstanding Educator Award conferred by Founder of International Buddhist College, Thailand, on September 7, 2019.
- 2019: Atisha Dipankar Peace Gold Award conferred by HH. Sanghanayaka Suddhananda, Sangharaja of Bangladesh Bouddha Kristi Prachar Sangha, October 21, 2019
- 2019: The Award for Patronaging and Supporting Buddhism conferred by Somdej Phra Ariyavongsagatanana, Sangharaja, Supreme Patriarch of Thailand, July 16, 2019.
- 2019: Global Mahasaddhamjotika Award conferred by President of Younker Historical Research Foundation, March 7, 2019.
- 2021: Vaishakh Samman Prashastri Patra Award (Vesak Citation of Honour) conferred by Ministry of Culture Government of India, Bodhgaya, May 26, 2021.
- 2021: The Symbol of Peace Award conferred by Pallavi T, President of the Neeraja Universal Peace Foundation, India, September 21, 2021.
- 2021: Global Messenger of Peace Award conferred by
- 2021: The Symbol of Peace Award conferred by Kepeel Barsaiyan, President of Buddh Jyoti Foundation, India, September 21, 2021.
- 2021: Social Change and World Peace Award by Bhikkhu Pragyadeep, General Secretary of All India Bhikkhu Sangha, Bihar, India, September 30, 2021.
- 2021: Outstanding Contribution to Education Award by Acharya Norbu Sherpa, President of Nepal Buddhist Federation, September 20, 2021.
- 2021: Dr. Sarvepalli Radhakrishnan Best Faculty Award 2021 conferred by Dr.Ratnakar D. Bala, President of Center for Professional Advancement Continuous Education - CPACE, India, September 5, 2021.
- 2021: Exemplary COVID-19 Social Work Award conferred by Bhikkhu Vinaybodhi, President, Mumbai Pradesh Bhikkhu Sangha, India, September 30, 2021.
- 2021: Best Leadership Award conferred by Chandrabhan Patil, president of The Buddhist Society of India, India, September 30, 2021.
- 2021: The Award for Mindful Educator conferred by Sulekhatai Kumbhare, president of Ogawa Society, September 30, 2021.
- 2021: World Teacher's Day Award conferred by Prof. Ratnakar, director of IMRF Institute of Higher Education & Research, October 5, 2021.

== Vietnamese Government Awards and Recognitions ==
- 2008: Vietnamese Prime Minister's Award conferred by Prime Minister Nguyen Tan Dung.
- 2014: Vietnam Union of UNESCO Associations Award conferred by President of Vietnam Union of UNESCO Associations.
- 2015: Award of the Vietnam Fatherland Front Committee of HCM City conferred by President of Vietnam Fatherland Front Committee of HCM Cityon January 19, 2015
- 2016: HCM City People's Committee Award conferred by President Nguyễn Thành Phong on November 3, 2016 .
- 2016: Award of the Vietnam Fatherland Front Committee of Tien Giang Province conferred by President of Vietnam Fatherland Front Committee of Tien Giang Provinceon January 12, 2016 .
- 2017: Vietnamese Prime Minister's Award for Serving Buddhism and Nation conferred by Prime Minister Nguyễn Xuân Phúc on November 20, 2017 .
- 2017: Award of the Central Committee of the Vietnam Fatherland Front conferred by President on September 12, 2017 .
- 2017: Award of the Vietnam Fatherland Front Committee of HCM City conferred by President on February 20, 2017 .
- 2017: Award of the Vietnam Fatherland Front Committee of Tien Giang Province conferred by President on March 7, 2017 .
- 2018: Award of the People's Committee of District 10 conferred by president on November 20, 2018 .
- 2018: Award of the People's Committee of District 10 conferred by president on January 5, 2018 .
- 2018: Certificate of Merit from the director of Blood Transfusion Hospital conferred by director on November 26, 2018.
- 2018: Certificate of Merits for Good People – Good Deeds 2018 conferred by president on November 14, 2018 .
- 2019: Vietnamese Prime Minister's Award for Excellent Education conferred by Prime Minister Nguyễn Xuân Phúc on September 17, 2019 .
- 2019: Vietnamese Prime Minister's Award conferred by Prime Minister Nguyễn Xuân Phúc on November 11, 2019 .
- 2019: Minister of Health Award conferred by Health Minister Nguyễn Thị Kim Tiến on January 17, 2019 .
- 2020: Award of the Vietnam Fatherland Front Committee of HCM City conferred by President Tô Thị Bích Châu on July 1, 2020
- 2021: Award of the Vietnam Fatherland Front Committee of Dong Nai Province conferred by President of Vietnam Fatherland Front Committee of Dong Nai Province on Sep 8, 2021.
- 2021: Award of the Vietnam Fatherland Front Committee of HCM City conferred by President Tô Thị Bích Châu on Sep 10, 2020.

== National Vietnam Buddhist Sangha Awards ==
- 2003, 2004, 2005, 2006: HCMC Buddhist Sangha's Merit Award.
- 2007: HCMC Buddhist Sangha's Outstanding Award, term of office 2002–2007
- 2008: National Vietnam Buddhist Sangha's Outstanding Merit Award
- 2009, 2010, 2011, 2012: HCMC Buddhist Sangha's Merit Award
- 2012: HCMC Buddhist Sangha's Outstanding Merit Award, term of office 2007–2012
- 2012: Vietnam Buddhist University's Award
- 2013: HCMC Buddhist Sangha's Merit Award for Buddhist Education
- 2013: Vietnam Guinness Record “The best Editor and publisher of Buddhist books”
- 2014: Vietnam Buddhist Research Institute's Outstanding Merit Award for Buddhist Education
- 2014: HCMC Buddhist Sangha's Merit Award for Buddhist Culture Promotion
- 2014: National Vietnam Buddhist Sangha's Outstanding Merit Award.
- 2016: HCMC Buddhist Sangha's Merit Award for Buddhist Culture Promotion.
- 2017: Vietnam Buddhist Research Institute's Outstanding Merit Award for Buddhist Research.
- 2017: National Vietnam Buddhist Sangha's Outstanding Merit Award for Buddhist Publication.
- 2017: National Vietnam Buddhist Sangha's Outstanding Merit Award for International Buddhist Affairs.
- 2017: HCMC Buddhist Sangha's Merit Award for Buddhist Culture Promotion.
- 2017: National Vietnam Buddhist Sangha's Outstanding Merit Award for Buddhist Education.
- 2017: National Vietnam Buddhist Sangha's Outstanding Merit Award for Dharma Propagation.

== Promotion of the Buddhist culture ==
Since 2002, Thich Nhat Tu set up a Buddhist Music Club in Ho Chi Minh city, with the participation of many famous songwriters, singers and actors to propagate the Buddhist philosophy and practice for general public. He is the editor and publisher of more than 150 CD, VCD, DVD of Buddhist music since 2002.

Being a secretary general of Cultural Department, HCMC Buddhist Sangha (2002–2007) and chairman of the Cultural Department of HCMC Buddhist Sangha (since 2012), every year he organises many Buddhist cultural performances at Lan Anh theatre and Hoa Binh theatre. On top of that, many Buddhist exhibitions, calligraphy, and arts have been organised by him too.

He wrote Follow the Footsteps of the Buddha in India and Nepal, a book that bought the inspiration for the VTC1 Television to accompany him to India to make documentary film about Buddhist pilgrimage in India and Nepal.

== Charity for the poor and jail inmates ==
He is an active social activist and charity fundraiser to help the poor, the old, children, homeless and those suffered from natural disasters, etc... He formed Buddhism Today Charity Group in 2000 to sponsor hundreds of eyes operation a year, donating to Social Support Centers, Retirement Houses, Orphanage Houses, Youth Education Centers, and cancer patients in many hospitals in Vietnam.

He has conducted meditation retreats for thousands of inmates in several rehabilitation facilities and correctional facilities in South Vietnam, such as Tan Hiep (1200 inmates), Chanh Phu Hoa (1000 inmates), Phu Nghia (400 inmates) and Ba Ria Vung Tau (800 inmates).

On February 5 and April 23, 2007, a total of 1850 “long-term” inmates of K.20 Prison, a security jail in Ben Tre Province, and on May 1, 2010, a total of 5500 inmates of Son Phu 4, Thai Nguyen city, under his guidance, have observed vegetarianism and mindfulness practice as a path to inner freedom.

== The Buddhist Youth Club ==
He took part in the foundation of The Buddhist Youth Club in 2006. He promoted the youth activities in South Vietnam in 2010 in which there were 4,000 young Buddhists from 24 cities and provinces to participate in the Buddhist Summer Camp in Dai Nam Theme Park, Binh Duong Province.

Nowadays his model of Buddhist Youth Club has been applied by many provincial Buddhist Sanghas to propagate Buddhism and organise retreats for lay followers, as well as giving exam consultation every year.,

== The Dhamma Door ==
In hundreds of his Dharma talks, Ven. Thich Nhat Tu urges monks, nuns, and lay people to practice the original teachings of the Buddha, in which The Four Noble Truths (sufferings, origin of sufferings, cessation of sufferings, and path leading to cessation of sufferings) and The Noble Eightfold Path are the central doctrine of all Buddhist traditions, a conceptual framework for all of Buddhist thoughts, instead of being influenced by the Chinese Buddhism.

According to Ven Thich Nhat Tu, there is no such of 84,000 Dharma doors as stated by Chinese schools. In original Buddhism, there is no second Dharma door except threefold learning Discipline, Meditation, and Wisdom. Chinese Dharmas only focus on a few sutras, and tend to ignore all other teachings of the Buddha, as a consequence it is not comprehensive enough to help people cure sufferings completely. To him, 10 Dhamma Doors of China, 14 Dhamma Doors of Japan, and 4 of Tibet are only two parts of The Noble Eightfold Paths which are Right Mindfulness and Right Concentration. Dharma doors propagators have ignored Right View, Right Thought, Right Speech, Right Action, Right Livelihood, and Right Effort. That is why none of the Dharma Doors is comprehensive.

He urges Vietnamese Buddhist monks, nuns and lay followers to come back to the traditional Buddhism, maintain and propagate Vietnamese Buddhist culture in Vietnam, not to let it be influenced by Chinese traditions which have rooted in Vietnam in the past 2,000 years. He calls for a traditional Vietnamese chanting and writing. In Vietnam, all should be chanted and written in Vietnamese language so that everyone understands and follows the Buddha's teaching appropriately, as the full transition of Chinese tradition has deteriorated the initiatives and growth of Vietnamese Buddhism.

== United Nations Day of Vesak 2008 and 2014 in Vietnam ==
The greatest contribution of Ven. Thich Nhat Tu to the public relation of Vietnam Buddhist Sangha is successfully calling for the celebration of UN Day of Vesak (UNDV) (United Nations Day of Vesak) 2008 and 2014 in Vietnam. As the deputy secretary of International Organising Committee (IOC) of United Nations Day of Vesak in Bangkok, he drafted the charter of UNDV, and introduced Le Manh That to IOC of UNDV. As a result, in late 2007, Le Manh That was appointed by IOC as chairman and Ven. Thich Nhat Tu as secretary general of UNDV in 2008, hosted by the Government of Vietnam at National Conference Center, Hanoi, Vietnam.

UNDV 2008 has attracted 550 Buddhist leaders and representatives from 78 countries to attend, while UNDV 2014 attended by 1100 international participants from 95 countries. In 2008, it was one of the 10 biggest events of the country, also a historical record in Vietnam.

UNDV in 2008 and 2014 proved an spectacle of religious and spiritual festivity, with thousands of Buddhists from the world to spread Buddha's message of peace, love and harmony.

He successfully called for the celebration of World Buddhist Summit in Vietnam in 2010, in the Millennial Anniversary of Hanoi. Unfortunately, it was cancelled due to conflicted views between VN Buddhist Sangha and World Buddhist Summit Organisation. It is believed that Thich Nhat Tu is of Vietnamese Monks who has been able to being a bridge between National Vietnam Buddhist Sangha and international Sanghas. Thanks to that VN Buddhist Sangha has gained its reputation internationally.

== Thích Nhật Từ's Positions 2022-2027 ==
- Standing member of Vietnam Buddhist Sangha's Executive Council, and Standing Vice Chairman of International Buddhist Affairs Vietnam Buddhist Sangha
- Standing Vice Rector of Vietnam Buddhist University, HCM city
- Vice Director of Vietnam Buddhist Search Institute, and General Editor of Vietnamese Tripitaka Translation project
- Vice Chairman of National Department of Buddhist Education
- Vice Chairman of Vietnam Buddhist Sangha of HCM City, and Chairman of Department of International Buddhist Affairs

== Published works ==
=== English books ===
- Buddhist Soteriological Ethics: A Study of the Buddha’s Central Teachings. Sai Gon: Oriental Press, 2011.
- Inner Freedom: A Spiritual Journey for Jail Inmates. Hanoi: News Agency Press, 2008, 2011, 2014.
- Engaged Buddhism, Social Change and World Peace. Hanoi: Religion Press, 2014.
- United Nations Day of Vesak 2008. Hanoi: Religion Press, 2014.
- Buddhist Art: An Exhibition Celebrating UN Vesak 2014. Hanoi: Religion Press, 2014.

=== Books on applied Buddhism ===
- Pure Land Paradise: An Analysis of Amitabha Sutra. Saigon: The Oriental Press, 2009. p. 142.
- Life after Death. Saigon: Sai Gon Culture Press, 2010. p. 126.
- A Guide for Writing Research Paper. Saigon: HCM Publishing House, 2003. p. 200.
- Understanding the Sutra of Forty-two Chapters. Sai Gon: New Age Press, 2010. p. 499.
- Letting go for Freedom. Saigon: The Oriental Press, 2010. p. 87.
- Transformation of Emotion. Saigon: New Age Press, 2010. p. 112.
- Understanding, Love and Sympathy. Saigon: New Age Press, 2010. p. 174.
- Global Financial Crisis from a Buddhist Point of View. Saigon: Hai Phong Press, 2009. p. 152.
- No Enemy: A Buddhist Approach to Peace. Saigon: New Age Press, 2010. p. 121.
- Transformation of Anger. Saigon: The Oriental Press, 2010. p. 180.
- Facing the Death. Saigon: New Age Press, 2010. p. 169.
- Turning Your Head, There Is a Shore. Saigon: The Oriental Press, 2010. p. 202.
- Happiness in Daily Life. Saigon: The Oriental Press, 2010. p. 194.
- A Peaceful Path. Saigon: The Oriental Press, 2010. p. 168.
- Happiness in Your Palms. Saigon: The Oriental Press, 2010. p. 149.
- A Pair of Sleeper: A Buddhist Approach to Happy Marriage. Saigon: The Oriental Press, 2010. p. 178.
- Buddhism in Modern Era. Saigon: The Oriental Press, 2011. p. 171.
- Happiness for the Elderly. Saigon: The Oriental Press, 2011. p. 130.
- A Healthy and Happy Life. Saigon: The Oriental Press, 2012. p. 124.
- Ten Important Things to be remembered. Hanoi: Hong Duc Press, 2012. p. 128.
- 14 Golden Teachings of the Buddha. Hanoi: Hong Duc Press, 2012. p. 117.
- The Path to Transformation: Application of the Eightfold Path in Daily Life. Hanoi: Hong Duc Press, 2012. p. 208.
- The Sutra on the Eight Realizations of the Great Beings: A Practical Approach. Hanoi: Hong Duc Press, 2012. p. 194.
- Essence of Wisdom: A Practical Interpretation of the Heart Sutra. Saigon: The Oriental Press, 2012. p. 266.
- Buddhist Thought Magazine, editor. Saigon: 1991

=== Buddhist chanting books (translator) ===
- Buddhist Daily Chanting Book. Hanoi: Religion Press, 1994, 2005, p. 992.
- Buddhist Ritual Book. Saigon: The Oriental Press, 2011, p. 390.
- Kṣitigarbha Sutra. Hanoi: Religion Press, 2008, p. 154.
- Sutra on the last teachings of the Buddha. Hanoi: Religion Press, 2009, p. 62.
- Collection of Buddhist Mantras. Hanoi: Religion Press, 2010. p. 30.
- Gratitude to Parents Chanting Book. Hanoi: Religion Press, 2006. p. 62.
- Buddha Jayanti Chanting Book. Hanoi: Religion Press, 2006. p. 48.
- Buddhist Repentance Book. Hanoi: Religion Press, 2002. p. 52.
- Sutra on Amitabha Buddha. Hanoi: Religion Press, 2003.
- Buddhist Prayer for the Death. Hanoi: Religion Press, 2005. p. 68.
- Buddhist Prayer for the Disease. Hanoi: Religion Press, 2005. p. 40.
- Vesak Chanting Book. Hanoi: Religion Press, 2006.
- Metta Sutta and Mangala Sutta. Hanoi: Religion Press, 2009. p. 42.
- Buddhist Sutras for Beginners. Hanoi: Hong Duc Publisher, 2013. p. 124.
- Buddhist Sutras for the Laity. Hanoi: Religion Press, 2013. p. 980.

=== Vietnamese Buddhist music ===
PART I: BUDDHIST SONGS BY THEMES

=== I. SONGS ON "THE BUDDHA" ===
- Life of the Buddha (Cuộc đời đức Phật)
- Life of Shakyamuni Buddha (Cuộc đời đức Phật Thích-ca)
- Siddhartha's Birthday (Tất-đạt-đa đản sanh)
- Happy Buddha's Birthday (Mừng Phật đản sanh)
- Celebrating the birth of Shakyamuni Buddha (Mừng Phật vào đời)
- The story of Shakyamuni Buddha descending to earth (Chuyện Phật Thích-ca giáng trần)
- Siddhartha the Buddha (Đức Phật Thích-ca)
- In search of the truth that saves all beings (Đi tìm chân lý cứu muôn loài)
- Siddhartha renunciation (Tất-đạt-đa xuất gia)
- Song of the enlightenment (Tất-đạt-đa xuất gia)
- Celebrate Buddhahood (Mừng Phật thành đạo)
- The Three Insights of the Buddha (Ba tuệ giác của Phật)
- The Buddha turned the Dharma Wheel (Đức Phật chuyển pháp luân)
- Buddha’s turning the Dharma Wheel for saving all beings (Phật chuyển pháp luân độ đời)
- Buddha’s loving kindness (Tình thương của Phật)
- Buddha’s boundless mind (Tâm Phật vô biên)
- Buddha saves humanity (Đức Phật cứu nhân loại)
- Refuge in Buddha (Con nương tựa Phật)
- I follow the Buddha’s truth (Con theo chân lý Phật)
- Buddha Truth (chân lý Phật)
- Wisdom of Buddha (Trí tuệ của Phật)
- Buddha’s passing away (Tưởng niệm đức Phật niết-bàn)

=== II. SONGS ON "FOLLOWING THE BUDDHA'S FOOTSTEPS" ===
- 1. The Buddha within you (Có Phật trong con)
- 2. The Buddha’s path (Con đường của Phật)
- 3. Meeting with Buddha through incarnations (Con gặp Phật qua các hóa thân)
- 4. Being a Vietnamese Buddhist (Con là Phật tử Việt Nam)
- 5. Following the Buddha (Con theo Phật)
- 6. Looking and Meeting the Buddha (Con tìm Phật và gặp Phật)
- 7. Be enlightened by the Buddha (Được Phật dẫn đường soi sáng)
- 8. Take refuge in the Triple Gem (Nương tựa Phật Pháp Tăng)
- 9. Buddha's grace loves you (Ơn Phật thương con)
- 10. Buddha guides my life (Phật dìu dắt đời con)
- 11. The Dharma enlightens my life (Phật pháp soi sáng đời con)
- 12. Blessed may I meet the Buddha (Phúc cho con gặp Phật)
- 13. Thank the Buddha for embracing Buddhism (Tạ ơn Phật cho con gặp đạo vàng)
- 14. I go looking for me (Tôi đi tìm tôi)
- 15. I met the Buddha in three sinking seven floats (Tôi gặp Phật trong ba chìm bảy nổi)
- 16. Because the Buddha loves me (Vì Phật thương con)
- 17. Innocent Novices (Chú tiểu hồn nhiên)
- 18. I follow Buddha to save humanity (Con theo Phật cứu đời)
- 19. Kathina offering (Dâng y cúng dường)
- 20. Offering Kathina to Sangha (Dâng y Kathina)
- 21. Buddhism (Đạo Phật)
- 22. Follow the Master's example (Noi gương thầy)
- 23. Buddha's grace chose me (Ơn Phật đã chọn con)
- 24. Hingly divine grace (Ơn thiêng cao ngất)
- 25. Live spiritually in the daily life (Sống đạo giữa đời thường)
- 26. Follow in the footsteps of Buddha (Theo dấu chân Phật)
- 27. Why follow Buddha (Vì sao theo Phật)
- 28. May Buddha give me (Xin Phật cho con)
- 29. Head shaving and ordination (Xuống tóc xuất gia)
