= Hidden character stone =

Chinese historical artifact

Coordinates: 26°01′14″N 107°04′38″E

Hidden Character Stone (Chinese: 藏字石 / 救星石; pinyin: cángzì shí / jiùxīng shí) is a stone located in a scenic area in the town of Zhangbu (掌布镇), Pingtang County, Qiannan Buyei and Miao Autonomous Prefecture, Guizhou. The stone features several glyph-like patterns on its surface that have been tentatively identified as Simplified Chinese characters or Traditional Chinese characters, the meaning of which has been variously interpreted as "Communist Party of China" (中國共產党), or alternatively "Communist Party of China perish" (中國共產党亡).

== Area ==
The Hidden Character Stone is one of the main attractions - along with a jade water basin (玉水金盆) - located at the Qiannan Pingtang National Geological Park (黔南平塘地质公园). The park has an area of about 201.6 square kilometers. The stone is situated within a narrow gap between two cliffs, just wide enough for two people to stand adjacent.

== History ==
In June 2002, the Duyun international photography exposition (都匀国际摄影博览会) recommended an area in Zhangbu as a photo spot. The stone was discovered during the cleanup process following the exposition's conclusion. The site has been isolated and effectively untouched by humans for centuries. According to the Chinese official Xinhua News Agency the person who initially discovered the site was local party secretary Wang Guo-fu (王国富), who noticed the characters written on the stone as he was stacking poles in the cleft in the rock.

Between December 5–8 2003 a Chinese scientific inspection group of about 15 scientists is reported to have investigated the stone. Some of the more notable members include Li Ting-dong (李廷栋) from Chinese Academy of Sciences, Liu Bao-jun (刘宝君) from Chinese academy of Sciences and Li Feng-lin (李凤麟) from China University of Geosciences. The stone was analyzed and determined to be about 270 million years old, with a likely provenance in the Permian period.

Liu Bao-jun expressed support for additional research into the stone and its history, and was interested in the natural formation of the "characters" thereon. Each character on the stone measures about one square shaku in size, which is equivalent to about 1 square foot (0.09 square meters).

== Description ==
=== Five-character version ===
The five-character interpretation posits that the characters on the stone can be translated as "Communist Party of China" (中国共产党). This is the rendition publicly accepted in the People's Republic of China. This reading has also been referred to as 救星石, literally "savior stone". When recounting the narrative of the stone's discovery, Chinese sources usually adhere to the five-character interpretation.

=== Six-character version ===
The six-character version suggests the characters on the stone said "Communist Party of China perish" (中国共产党亡). Often when pictures are shown with the stone having six characters, the description still refers to it by the five-character version.

=== Traditional and Simplified Chinese ===
The characters on the stone are a mix of Traditional Chinese characters and Simplified Chinese characters. The first and third character (中, 共) are identical in both versions. The second character "country" (國) and fourth character "produce" (產) is in the traditional form. The fifth character, "party" (党) is in the simplified form. The sixth character "perish" (亡) has no difference. Some have analyzed all the odd characters as Simplified, while the even characters are Traditional.

- On the stone: 中國共產党亡
- Traditional Chinese: 中國共產黨亡
- Simplified Chinese: 中国共产党亡

=== Analysis ===
The origin of the characters remain a subject of dispute. There were some early speculations that the characters were put there by the People's Liberation Army, but according to the path of the Long March, they never went to Pingtang. The characters also read left to right, which was not practiced at the time. The inclusion of a Simplified character before the CPC did any simplifications also ruled them out. There were also some skeptics who suspected the village was creating a fraud to build their tourism industry at the time. Others think the Hidden Character Stone was made in the Cultural Revolution. Also, others, especially Christians, consider the message to be of divine origin, this idea being ridiculed by pro-Marxist groups.

== Cultural reference ==
The Hidden Character Stone has been featured as a topic on a number of science-oriented television programmes such as CCTV's "Approaching Science" (走近科学) and the Hong Kong ATV series "China's Mystery Files" (中國神祕檔案). In both instances the programs referred to the five-character reading of the stone.
