= Thich =

Thích is a name that Vietnamese monks and nuns take as their Buddhist surname to show affinity with the Buddha.

Notable Vietnamese monks with the name include:

- Thích Huyền Quang (1919–2008), political dissident and activist
- Thích Quảng Độ (1928–2020), critic of the Vietnamese government
- Thích Quảng Đức (1897–1963), who burned himself to death as a protest
- Thích Nhất Hạnh (1926–2022), Zen teacher, author, and peace activist
- Thích Nhật Từ (born 1969), public speaker and author
- Thích Thanh Từ (born 1924), author and teacher
- Thích Trí Quang (1924–2019), Mahayana leader of South Vietnam's Buddhist majority in 1963

== See also ==
- Thích Ca Phật Đài, temple in Vũng Tàu, Vietnam
