= Dhutanga =

Group of austerities or ascetic practices taught in Buddhism

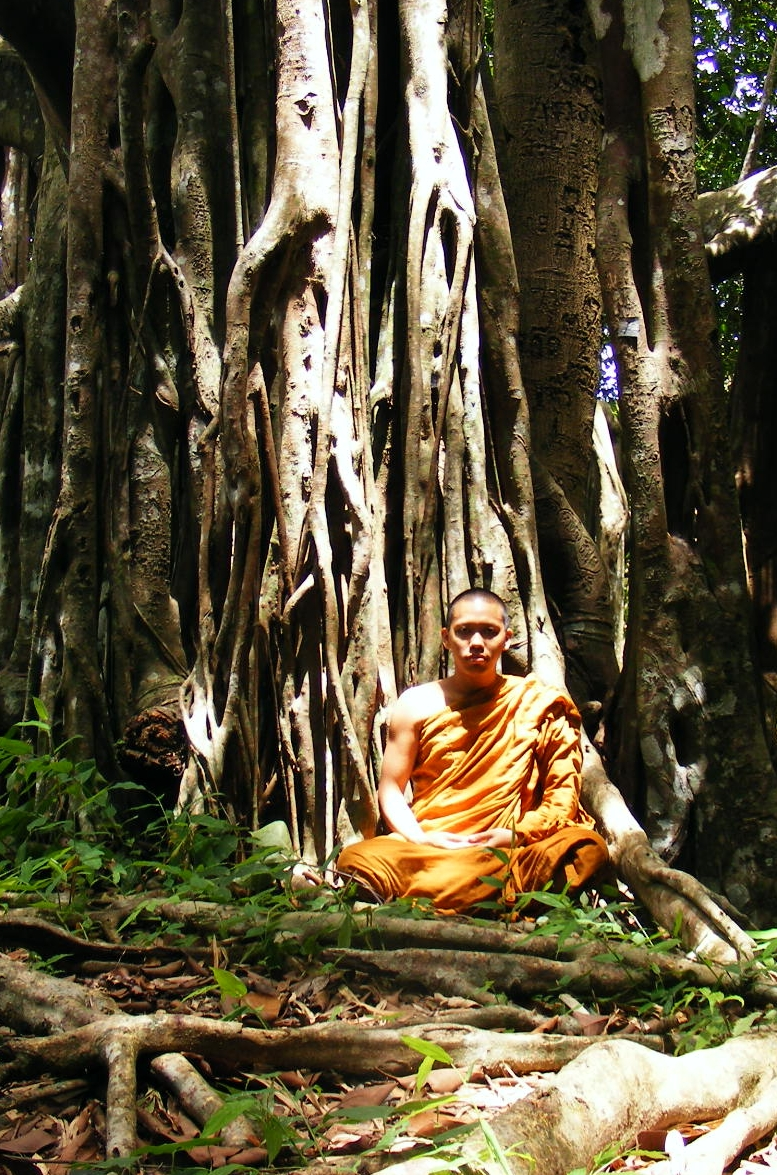
The dhutanga called "living under a tree without the shelter of a roof" (Pali: rukkhamulik'anga).

Dhutanga (Pali dhutaṅga, Sinhala: ධුතාඞ්ග) or dhūtaguṇa (Sanskrit) is a group of austerities or ascetic practices taught in Buddhism. The Theravada tradition teaches a set of thirteen dhutangas, while Mahayana Buddhist sources teach a set of twelve dhūtaguṇas. The term is generally understood to be derived from the root dhu "to shake" and could mean practices which help one "shake off" the defilements. Thus, the dhutangas are meant to help eliminate the defilements in the mind, and thus to deepen Buddhist practice. Their aim is to help the practitioner to develop detachment with material things including the body. Dhutanga practice is not considered a necessary requirement for a monk as is Śīla (virtue).

== Theravada Buddhism ==
As these thirteen ascetic practices are mentioned in the Pali Tipitaka merely by its name, the Visuddhimagga is considered the only place in the Theravada Literature where adequate descriptions on dhutangas are found. The Visuddhimagga, the central Theravada Buddhist commentary treatise, by highly revered 5th century monk Buddhaghosa Thera, sets out detailed practical instructions for developing purification of mind by devoting a whole chapter to discussing dhutangas.

=== The thirteen dhutangas ===
The "open-air-dweller's practice" (abbhokasik'anga) in Thailand

The Visuddhimagga lists the practices as follows:

Thirteen kinds of ascetic practices have been allowed by the Blessed One to clansmen who have given up the things of the flesh and, regardless of body and life, are desirous of undertaking a practice in conformity [with their aim]. They are:

1. Refuse-rag-wearer's Practice (pamsukulik'anga) — wearing robes made up from discarded or soiled cloth and not accepting and wearing ready-made robes offered by householders.
2. Triple-robe-wearer's Practice (tecivarik'anga) — Having and wearing only three robes and not having additional allowable robes.
3. Alms-food-eater's Practice (pindapatik'anga) — eating only food collected on pindapata or the almsround while not accepting food in the vihara or offered by invitation in a layman's house.
4. House-to-house-seeker's Practice (sapadanik'anga) — not omitting any house while going for alms; not choosing only to go to rich households or those selected for some other reason as relations, etc.
5. One-sessioner's practice (ekasanik'anga) — eating one meal a day and refusing other food offered after midday. (Those Gone Forth may not, unless ill, partake of food from midday until dawn the next day.)
6. Bowl-food-eater's Practice (pattapindik'anga) — eating food from his bowl in which it is mixed together rather than from plates and dishes.
7. Later-food-refuser's Practice (khalu-paccha-bhattik'anga) — not taking any more food after one has shown that one is satisfied, even though lay-people wish to offer more.
8. Forest-dweller's Practice (Araññik'anga) — not dwelling in a town or village but living secluded, away from all kinds of distractions.
9. Tree-root-dweller's Practice (rukkhamulik'anga) — living under a tree without the shelter of a roof.
10. Open-air-dweller's Practice (abbhokasik'anga) — refusing a roof and a tree-root, the practice may be undertaken sheltered by a tent of robes.
11. Charnel-ground-dweller's Practice (susanik'anga) — living in or nearby a charnel-field, graveyard or cremation ground (In ancient India there would have been abandoned and unburied corpses as well as some partially cremated corpses in such places.)
12. Any-bed-user's Practice (yatha-santhatik'anga) — being satisfied with any dwelling allotted as a sleeping place.
13. Sitter's Practice (nesajjik'anga) — living in the three postures of walking, standing and sitting and never lying down.

=== Benefits ===
Benefits of forest-dwelling practice, as mentioned in Visuddhimagga:

The benefits are these. A forest-dwelling bhikkhu who has given attention to the perception of forest (see MN 121) can obtain hitherto unobtained concentration, or preserve that already obtained. And the Master is pleased with him, according as it is said: "So, Nágita, I am pleased with that bhikkhu’s dwelling in the forest" (A III 343). And when he lives in a remote abode his mind is not distracted by unsuitable visible objects, and so on. He is free from anxiety; he abandons attachment to life; he enjoys the taste of the bliss of seclusion, and the state of the refuse-rag wearer, etc., becomes him. 55. He lives secluded and apart, remote abodes delight his heart; The Saviour of the world, besides, He gladdens that in groves abides. The hermit that in woods can dwell alone, may gain the bliss as well whose savour is beyond the price of royal bliss in paradise. Wearing the robe of rags he may go forth into the forest fray; such is his mail, for weapons too the other practices will do. One so equipped can be assured of routing Mára and his horde. So let the forest glades delight A wise man for his dwelling’s site.

== In Mahayana sources ==
Mahayana sources like the Samadhirajasūtra, the Daśabhūmikasūtra and Shantideva teach and promote the practice of twelve dhūtaguṇas as important elements of the bodhisattva path. The Dharma-saṃgraha lists the following:

1. paiṇḍapātika: (eating only) almsfood,
2. traicīvarika: (wearing only) three robes,
3. khalupaścādbhaktika: not (accepting more) after starting eating,
4. naiṣadyika: not lying down,
5. yathāsaṃstarika: bed in accordance (with whatever is offered),
6. vṛkṣamūlika: (living at) the root of a tree,
7. ekāsanika: (eating during) one sitting,
8. ābhyavakāśika: (living in an) empty place,
9. āraṇyaka: (living in a) wilderness,
10. śmāśānika: (living in a) charnel ground,
11. pāṃśūkūlika: (wearing only) robes made from discarded materials,
12. nāmatika: (wearing only) felt garments.

The Samadhirajasūtra lists the advantages that one gains from practicing the dhūtaguṇas:

He is free from "deceit and loquacity (or from deceitful talk). He does not exalt himself; and he does not revile (or decry) others. He moves about in the houses (of the laity) without undue friendliness or repugnance. He preaches the Doctrine (literally, "bestows the gift of the dharma") in a disinterested spirit. His religious teaching is effective.

== Notable Practitioners ==
1. Maha Kassapa Thera (The top monk among dhutanga practitioners)
2. Sariputta Thera (The top monk among the Wise and also a dhutanga practitioner)
3. Khadiravaniya Revata Thera (The top monk among Forest Dwellers)
4. Bakkula Thera (The top monk among Sitters)
5. Moghraja Thera (The top monk among Rough Robe Wearers)
6. Nalaka Thera (The beginner of Nalaka Patipada)
7. Thich Minh Tue (Almsrounding Vietnamese ascetic)

=== Mahākassapa Thera ===
Mahākassapa was one of the most revered of the Buddha's disciples, the renunciant par excellence. He was praised by the Buddha as foremost in ascetic practices (Pali: dhutavādānaṃ) and a foremost forest dweller. Mahākassapa Thera took upon him the thirteen ascetic practices (including living in the wilderness, living only from alms and wearing rag-robes) and became an enlightened disciple (arahat) in nine days. He excelled in supernatural accomplishments (Pali: iddhi; Sanskrit: ṛddhi) and was equal to the Buddha in meditative absorption (Pali: jhāna; Sanskrit: dhyāna). He is depicted as a monk with great capacity to tolerate discomfort and contentment with the bare necessities of life.

It is said that Mahākassapa assumed leadership of the monastic community following the paranibbāṇa (death) of the Buddha. And in many post-canonical texts, Mahākassapa decided at the end of his life to enter a state of meditation and suspended animation, which was believed to cause his physical remains to stay intact in a cave under a mountain called Kukkuṭapāda, until the coming of Metteyya Buddha.
