= Shaku =

Shaku may refer to:

- Shaku (unit of length)
- Shaku (unit of volume and area)
- Shaku (ritual baton)
- Buddhist surname of Japan
- Shaku, Iran, a village in Markazi Province, Iran
