= Zhi Dun =

Chinese Buddhist philosopher (314–366)

Zhidun
- 支遁
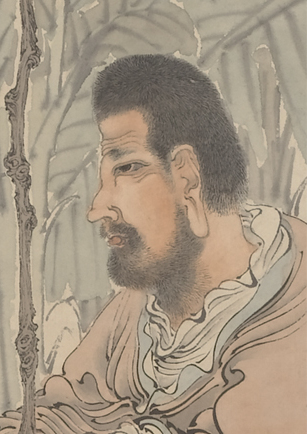
- The Monk Zhidun Admiring a Horse (1876, cropped) by Ren Yi

Personal life
- Born: Guan (關) (surname); 314 Kaifeng, Western Jin
- Died: 29 May 366 (aged 51–52) Kuaiji Commandery, Eastern Jin
- Other name: Daolin (道林) (courtesy name)

Religious life
- Religion: Buddhism
- Temple: Zhishan Temple (支山寺); Lingjia Temple (霊嘉寺); Qiguang Temple (棲光寺)
- Dharma name: Zhidun

Zhi Dun (Chinese: 支遁; 314–366), courtesy name Daolin, was a Chinese Buddhist monk and philosopher. His birth surname was Guan. A Chinese author, scholar and confidant of Chinese government officials in 350, he claimed that all who followed Buddhism would, at the end of their life, enter Nirvana.

According to Kenneth Tanaka, Zhi Dun was a well respected scholar of Neo Daoist philosophy who became a Buddhist. Tanaka also writes that in his works, Zhi Dun explained the metaphysical meaning of the term li (noumenon). Aside from his philosophical works, he also wrote various eulogies, one of which expresses his Pure Land faith in Amitabha and Sukhavati.

== Ethnicity ==
Tanaka writes that Zhi Dun "represents one of the earliest known Pure Land practitioners among the intellectual non ethnic Chinese". Zhi is an ethnonymic surname referring to an origin in Yuezhi or the Kushan Empire. However, Zhi Dun's biography in the Liang-dynasty Memoirs of Eminent Monks mentions that his original surname was Guan and that his family was from Henan. Zhi was the Buddhist surname he adopted on ordination, reflecting the ethnicity of his preceptor rather than his own.

== Life ==
Erik Zürcher refers to Zhi Dun as "the most famous and most representative" of what he terms the gentleman-monks, men from the gentry class who became prominent Buddhist monks in fourth-century China. As such, he was well-educated in the secular arts as well as Neo Daoism, pure conversation, and exegesis.

In A Short History of Chinese Philosophy, Feng Youlan recounts a story from the Shishuo Xinyu regarding Zhi Dun's fondness for cranes:

Once a friend gave him two young [cranes]. When they grew up, Chih-tun was forced to clip their wings so that they would not fly away. When this was done, the cranes looked despondent, and Chih-tun too was depressed, and said: "Since they have wings that can reach the sky, how can they be content to be a pet of man?" Hence when their feathers had grown again, he let the cranes fly away.

== Philosophy ==
The following translation by E. Zürcher is an example of Zhi Dun's Pure Land faith, the earliest surviving example of Chinese Pure Land Buddhism:

In this country [Sukhavati] there is no arrangement of royal regulations, ranks and titles. The Buddha is the ruler, and the three Vehicles are the [state] doctrine . . . . Whosoever in this country of Chin, in this era of sensual pleasures, serves the Buddha and correctly observes the commandments, who recites the Scripture of Amitabha*, and who [furthermore] makes a vow to be [re]born in that country of [Sukhavati*] without ever abandoning his sincere intention, will at the end of his life, when his soul passes away, be miraculously transported thither. He will behold the Buddha and be enlightened in his spirit, and then he will realize the Way. I, Tun, born at this late time, [can only] hope to follow the remaining traces [of the doctrine], and I do not dare to expect that my mind is bound for that spiritual country. Hence I had a painting made by an artisan, and erected this as a manifestation of the divine [power]; respectfully I look to the noble appearance [of this Buddha] in order to confront myself with Him whom [I adore like] Heaven.

== Works (selected) ==
The Memoirs of Eminent Monks records that Zhi Dun's works were collected in ten juan. Most, however, are no longer extant. Both the Memoirs and Lu Cheng's 5th-century collection of Chinese Buddhist texts, the Falun 法論, list titles of Zhi Dun's works, including the following.

- Jiseyouxuan lun 卽色遊玄論 (On wandering in the Mystery (by realizing) the identity (of Emptiness) with Matter)
- Shi jise benwu yi 釋卽色本無義 (An Explanation of the Theory of Fundamental Non-being Being Identical with Matter)
- Shimeng lun 釋曚論 (Explanation to the Ignorant)
- Sheng bubian zhi lun 聖不辯智論 (Treatise on the Knowledge the Buddha Would not Argue)
- Qiewu zhang 切悟章 (Essay on the Urgency of Understanding), written in 365 CE at the death of his close friend Zhi Faqian
- Zuo you ming 坐右銘 (Right-hand Inscription), exhorting a disciple to study harder; fully preserved in the Memoirs of Eminent Monks
- Xiaoyao lun 逍遙論 (Commentary on the Zhuangzi chapter 'Unfettering'), quoted in the Shishuo Xinyu
- A memorial to Emperor Ai of Jin (365 CE) requesting permission to withdraw from the capital, in which Zhi Dun details his views on monastic life and the relationship between the ruler and religion; fully preserved in the Memoirs of Eminent Monks
- A letter to a 'monk from Koguryŏ', the first record connecting Koguryŏ and Buddhism
- Tiantaishan ming 天台山銘 (Inscription on the Tiantai mountain)
- Seventeen miscellaneous poems covering topics such as the Buddha's birthday, fasting, mountain living, and a painting of a dhyāna-master

Five of Zhi Dun's poems are written in the style of Ruan Ji's Singing of My Cares (咏懷) collection.
