= Freedom of religion in Vietnam =

While the Constitution of Vietnam officially provides for freedom of religion, in practice the government imposes a range of legislative measures restricting religious practice (such as registration requirements, control boards, and surveillance). All religious groups must register and seek approval from the government. The government requires all Buddhist monks to be approved by and work under the officially recognized Buddhist organization, the Vietnam Buddhist Sangha (VBS). The number of Buddhist student monks is controlled and limited by the Committee on Religious Affairs. According to a 2020 report by Human Rights Watch, prohibited religious activities are those deemed to be contrary to arbitrary notions of the "national interest", "public order", or "national unity". Unrecognized religious groups, including Cao Đài, Hòa Hảo, and some Christian and Buddhist groups face "constant surveillance and harassment". Some religious groups may be subject to "public criticism, forced renunciation of faith, detention, interrogation, torture, and imprisonment." Laws continue to be applied unevenly however, with some local government areas taking a more relaxed and tolerant approach than others.

In 2023, the country was scored 1 out of 4 for religious freedom by the American organization Freedom House. In the same year it was ranked as the 25th most difficult place in the world to be a Christian by Christian mission Open Doors.

== Background ==
Mahayana Buddhism is the largest organized religion in Vietnam. There is a significant minority of Catholic Christians. Other religions include Protestant Christianity, Theravada Buddhism, Islam, Hòa Hảo, and the syncretic Cao Đài religion. Many citizens consider themselves non-religious, although they may practice traditional beliefs such as veneration of ancestors and national heroes. Ethnic minorities historically practice different traditional beliefs than those of the ethnic majority Việt. Many ethnic minorities, particularly among the H'mong, Zao, and Jarai groups in the Northwest and Central Highlands, have converted to Protestantism.

Undeclared missionaries from several countries are active in the country. Foreign missionaries legally are allowed to proselytize or perform religious activities.

There are no religious national holidays.

=== History ===
During the Vietnam War, the US backed a Catholic politician named Ngô Đình Diệm for his leadership of South Vietnam. The US assumed that Diem would protect freedom of religion in South Vietnam, due to his deep faith, but instead he used his power to suppress Buddhism (which was the majority religion of South Vietnam) and promote Catholicism. The South Vietnamese government banned the flying of the Buddhist flag, leading to shooting of nine Buddhist civilians in 1963, culminating in the Buddhist crisis.

After the Fall of Saigon in 1975, North and South Vietnam were merged to form the Socialist Republic of Vietnam in 1976. The Constitution of Vietnam was adopted in the south of the country. The Communist Party of Vietnam promoted their Marxist–Leninist ideology in the country.

The Communists were influenced by anti-colonial and nationalist traditions in Vietnam, including the writings of Phan Bội Châu. During the First Indochina War (1946–1954), despite its doctrinal atheism, the Indochinese Communist Party made efforts at recruiting religious believers to its side. The Catholic minority, while being obviously linked to the French presence, were seen as potential allies rather than ipso facto opponents, provided they could be recruited to the anti-colonial side. Catholic missionaries were condemned in party propaganda, but Vietnamese Catholics were called upon as compatriots to embrace nationalism. Anti-Catholic criticism was thereby focused on French Catholic clerics as a foreign element and avoided doctrinal criticism of the beliefs of the church. In an effort to reach out to Vietnamese Catholics, Ho Chi Minh attended Christmas Mass in 1945 and included Catholics in his cabinet.

The Communist Party in the North from 1954 and from the South from 1975, attacked many traditional religious practices and folk beliefs. The spirit worship of common people was interpreted from the Marxist perspective as being a survival from an earlier stage of social evolution when people deified nature in their inability to overcome or control it. These beliefs were considered illusory and that they made people 'impotent' and fatalistic. These beliefs were considered to undermine people's confidence and did not encourage them to believe people could solve their own problems. The spirit worship was considered by the communists as a tool of 'feudal' elites to maintain their oppressive rule. Lady Liễu Hạnh, a goddess worshipped in Vietnamese folk religion was also considered an importation from Chinese taoism and therefore a legacy of Chinese colonialism.

After the Communists won the war and reunified Vietnam, the government in Hanoi turned to suppress religion with great force. Many Buddhists had been opposed to the war and when the Communists achieved victory, the anti-war efforts by Vietnamese Buddhists were marginalized by the government. The Buddhist peace activist Cao Ngoc Phuong (who had been previously jailed by the Saigon government) was branded a ‘war criminal’ by the Hanoi regime.

Buddhist self-immolations, like the kind that had occurred in South Vietnam against the government in Saigon, soon occurred in the unified Vietnam in protest of the government's treatment of Buddhism. In November 1975, 12 Buddhist monks and nuns immolated themselves in Cần Thơ. In 1977, Thich Nu Nhu Hien burned herself in Hanoi in order to be a ‘torch of wisdom’ that would bring the government to embrace religious tolerance. Many of the Buddhists who burned themselves in protest of the Communist government belonged to the United Buddhist Church of Vietnam, which was banned by Hanoi afterwards.

Many Vietnamese held greater respect for the Buddhist hierarchy than for the communist government, and many people in opposition to the government saw Buddhism as an alternative to Marxism. Government opposition has portrayed Marxism as being a foreign western ideology, while Buddhism was linked to the indigenous heritage of Vietnam.

The Đổi Mới policy of 1986 changed the Vietnamese government's position on outside influence in the country.

This article is informed by the US State Dept 2007 report on religious freedom in Vietnam. Later reports are available.[14]

== Status of religious freedom ==
=== Legal and policy framework ===
The Constitution, legal code, and a 2003 Communist Party Central Committee resolution on religion provide for freedom of belief and worship, as well as nonbelief; however, the government required the registration of all activities by religious groups and used this requirement to restrict activities in certain cases. The government continued to significantly limit the organized activities of independent religious groups and those individuals who were regarded as a threat to party authority.

The New Ordinance on Religion and Belief, which came into effect in November 2004, serves as the primary document governing religious practice. It reiterates citizens' rights to freedom of belief, freedom of religion, and freedom not to follow a religion, and it states that violations of these freedoms are prohibited. However, it advises that "abuse" of freedom of belief or religion "to undermine the country's peace, independence, and unity" is illegal and warns that religious activities must be suspended if they negatively affect the cultural traditions of the nation.

The Ordinance continues the practice of government control and oversight of religious organizations. Under its provisions, religious denominations must be officially recognized or registered, and the activities and leadership of individual religious congregations must be approved by the appropriate lower-level authorities. The establishment of seminaries and the organization of and enrollment in classes must also be approved by appropriate authorities. The naming of priests or other religious officials requires the approval of authorities only when a "foreign element", such as the Vatican, is involved. The ordinance also relaxes government oversight of religion to some extent. For example, religious organizations are required only to inform appropriate authorities of their annual activities or the investiture and transfer of clerics, while in the past this required explicit official approval. The ordinance encourages religious groups to carry out charitable activities in health care and education, which were limited in the past.

In February 2005 the Prime Minister issued the "Instruction on Some Tasks Regarding Protestantism", which calls on authorities to facilitate the requests of recognized Protestant denominations to construct churches and to train and appoint pastors. The instruction directs authorities to help unrecognized denominations register their congregations so that they can worship openly and move towards fulfilling the criteria required for full recognition. It directs authorities in the Central and Northwest Highlands to help groups of Protestant believers register their religious activities and practice in homes or "suitable locations", even if they do not meet the criteria to establish an official congregation. The instruction also directs local officials to allow unregistered "house churches" to operate so long as they are "committed to follow regulations" and are not affiliated with separatist political movements.

In March 2005 the government issued an implementing decree (Decree 22) that provided further guidance on the Ordinance on Religion and Belief. Like the ordinance, the decree explicitly bans forced renunciations of faith. It also delineates specific procedures by which an unrecognized religious organization can register its places of worship, its clerics, and its activities and thus operate openly. It further provides procedures for these groups to apply for official recognition from the government to gain additional rights. The decree specifies that a religious organization must have 20 years of "stable religious operation" in the country in order to be recognized by the government. It also states that past operation in the country can be counted toward this requirement. The decree further sets out specific time periods for the government to consider requests from religious organizations and requires officials to give organizations an explanation in writing for any application that is rejected.

Implementing Decree 22 also clarifies the procedures through which religious organizations and individual religious congregations can seek official recognition. Recognized religious denominations, in principle, are allowed to open, operate, and refurbish places of worship, train religious leaders, and obtain permission for the publication of materials. To obtain official recognition, a denomination must first receive national-level registration. According to the legal framework, a religious organization must pass through three legal stages to receive national-level registration. First, it must apply for and receive registration in each local administrative area in which it operates. Registration requires a congregation to file information with relevant provincial authorities about its structure, leadership, and activities. Authorities then have 45 days to raise questions or concerns. National-level registrations have a 60-day consideration period. The CRA must issue a license before an organization is considered registered. Once a congregation is registered at the local level, it can apply for provincial and then national-level registration. Following a minimum 1-year waiting period, the eligible organization can apply for recognition and must receive Government approval of its leadership, its structure, and the overall scope of its activities.

Decree 22 further specifies that the appropriate authorities provide a written response to requests for official recognition within 30, 45, 60, or 90 days, depending on the scope of the request. Government officials rarely adhered to these response times, however. In the case of a refusal, a specific reason must be included in the written response, although this requirement also did not appear to be applied systematically. Moreover, there is no specific mechanism for appeal in the ordinance, nor are the reasons for denying a request restricted in any way.

The national-level Committee for Religious Affairs is charged with disseminating information about the new legal framework to authorities at the provincial, district, commune, and village levels and assuring uniform compliance. Implementation of the new legal framework at lower levels of the government continued to be mixed. During the reporting period, national and provincial authorities held a number of training courses for lower-level officials about the new laws to ensure their understanding and compliance with the legal framework. Authorities in some areas actively engaged religious leaders in efforts to implement the changes, particularly the registration of Protestant groups and the reopening of closed churches in the Central Highlands region. Some authorities in other areas, particularly in some parts of the Central Highlands and the Mekong Delta, as well as the northern border area and Northwest Highlands provinces, were less active in enforcing the legal changes mandated by the central Government, although conditions for Protestants generally improved throughout the country during the reporting period.

National security and national solidarity provisions in the Constitution override laws and regulations providing for religious freedom, and these provisions reportedly have been used to impede religious gatherings and the spread of religion to certain ethnic groups. The Penal Code, as amended in 1997, established penalties for offenses that are defined only vaguely, including "attempting to undermine national unity" by promoting "division between religious believers and nonbelievers." In the past authorities used Article 258 of the Penal code to charge persons with practicing religion illegally. This article allows for prison terms of up to 3 years for "abus[ing] the rights to freedom of speech, freedom of press, freedom of belief, religion, assembly, association, and other democratic freedoms to infringe upon the interests of the State." Article 258 was not used to hinder religious practice during the reporting period.

The government does not officially favor a particular religion, and virtually all senior government and CPV officials, as well as the vast majority of National Assembly delegates, are formally "without religion." However, many party and government officials openly practice traditional ancestor worship, and some visit Buddhist pagodas. The prominent traditional position of Buddhism does not affect religious freedom for others adversely, including those who do not practice a religion.

The government officially recognizes Buddhist, Catholic, Protestant, Hòa Hảo, Cao Đài, and Muslim religious organizations. The Baháʼí Faith was registered nationally in 2007 and would be eligible to apply for national recognition in 2008. Individual congregations within each of these religious groups must be registered as well. Some leaders and believers of alternative Buddhist, Protestant, Hòa Hảo, and Cao Đài organizations of these religions do not participate in the government-approved religious associations.

The government's "White Book" reported that, as of the end of 2006, the government registered 718 SECV places of worship and officially recognized 67 SECV congregations and 71 SECV pastors.

During the reporting period, the government processed pilot registrations for approximately 40 ECVN congregations in 9 northern provinces. The CRA asserted that the pilot program was "a necessary step to avoid possible contradictions and complications in families and clans that might negatively affect the stable life of ordinary people." Furthermore, "the results secured in the provinces...of northern Vietnam have guided and would continue to guide religious persons and groups to register their religious activities in accordance with the Prime Minister's Instruction." As of the end of 2006, the government claimed it had recognized 16 religious organizations affiliated with 6 religions under implementation of the new framework.

== Implementation of 2004 legislation ==
The government deepened implementation of its 2004 Ordinance on Religion and Belief and supplemental decrees on religious policy issued in 2005. New congregations were registered throughout the country's 64 provinces; a number of religious denominations were registered at the national level; and citizens were generally allowed to practice religion more freely. Improving economic conditions in the country also allowed for greater access to religious practice and resources. In recognition of its "significant improvements towards advancing religious freedom", the United States Department of State lifted the country's designation as a Country of Particular Concern (CPC) for Religious Freedom in November 2006.

Despite progress during the reporting period, problems remained in the implementation of the country's legal framework on religion. These included slowness, and in some cases inaction, in the registration of Protestant congregations in northern Vietnam and the Northwest Highlands; inconsistent application of procedures for congregation registration and other legal requirements; ongoing restrictions on religious recruitment; difficulties in the establishment of Catholic seminaries and Protestant pastor training courses; and unresolved land expropriation claims involving a number of religious denominations. Some provincial authorities were more active, while others appeared not to consider positive and consistent implementation of the legal framework on religion as a priority. The Government rejected the appointment of two Catholic bishops endorsed by the Vatican. However, the Catholic Church reported that the government generally continued to ease restrictions on church assignment of new clergy, and the Church indicated that it had begun exploring with government authorities the establishment of additional Catholic seminaries.

The government continued to remain concerned that some ethnic minority groups active in the Central Highlands were operating a self-styled "Dega Church", which reportedly mixes religious practice with political activism and calls for ethnic minority separatism. The Government also actively restricted the leadership of the unrecognized Unified Buddhist Church of Vietnam (UBCV) and maintained that it would not recognize this organization under its current leadership. The Government maintained a prominent role overseeing recognized religions. Religious groups encountered the greatest restrictions when they engaged in activities that the government perceived as political activism or a challenge to its rule. The Government continued to ban and actively discourage participation in one unrecognized faction of the Hòa Hảo Buddhists. Government authorities imprisoned and disrobed a number of ethnic Khmer Buddhists for their involvement in antigovernment protests in the Mekong Delta in early 2007. Some religious figures, including Catholic priest Nguyen Van Ly and Protestant pastor Nguyen Van Dai, were sentenced to prison terms for their political activism.

Nevertheless, overall respect for religious freedom improved during the period covered by this report. Participation in religious activities throughout the country continued to grow, and Protestant believers in the Central Highlands continued to report significant improvements in their situation. Approximately 40 Protestant house churches were registered in northern Vietnam and hundreds in southern Vietnam during the reporting period. However, hundreds of other applications remained pending, especially in the Northwest Highlands. For the first time since 1975, the government authorized the printing of Bibles in three ethnic minority languages in the Central Highlands. During the reporting period, Protestantism remained the country's fastest growing religion among its six recognized faiths – Buddhism, Hòa Hảo Buddhism, Catholicism, Protestantism, Caodaism, and Islam.

The government registered several new religious denominations during the reporting period, including the Vietnam Seventh-Day Adventist Church, the Grace Baptist Church, the United World Mission Church, one faction of the Mennonite church, the Baháʼí Faith, and two smaller Buddhist groups—the Tu An Hieu Nghia group and the Pure Land Buddhist Home Practice Association.

During the reporting period, the national and some provincial Committees on Religious Affairs (CRA) were active in resolving religion-related problems and concerns. The national CRA organized a number of programs to offer training to members of religious denominations on legal registration procedures and to local authorities on how to implement the national legal framework on religion. On the occasion of the Asian Pacific Economic Conference (APEC) Summit and the visit of President George W. Bush to Hanoi in November 2006, the country's first-ever ecumenical religious service was held, led by the Catholic archdiocese of Hanoi and the Evangelical Church of Vietnam North (ECVN). In January 2007 the Prime Minister Nguyễn Tấn Dũng visited the Vatican and met with Pope Benedict XVI, and in March 2007, an official delegation from the Vatican reciprocated by visiting the country.

Protestants and Catholics across the north reported improvement in most officials' attitude towards their religion, and in general Protestants and Catholics were allowed to gather for worship without harassment, despite some isolated incidents. Christmas and Easter holidays passed generally without incident in the country. In the fall of 2006, the Southern Evangelical Church of Vietnam (SECV) reported its first-ever graduating class of 219 ordained pastors since the organization was officially recognized in 2001. During the reporting period, the government welcomed the return of Buddhist Zen Master Thich Nhat Hanh for a series of "reconciliation prayer events" in Ho Chi Minh City, Huế, and Hanoi.

There were no known instances of societal discrimination or violence based on religion during the reporting period.

In September 2004 then-Secretary of State Colin Powell designated the country a "Country of Particular Concern" (CPC) under the International Religious Freedom Act for particularly severe violations of religious freedom. In November 2006 Secretary of State Condoleezza Rice lifted the country's CPC designation, noting that the country could "no longer be identified as a severe violator of religious freedom" as defined by the Act.

Although the international media highlighted arrests and detentions of several political dissidents in early 2007, all individuals raised by the United States as prisoners of concern for reasons connected to their faith have been freed by the government. Some religious sources have cited diplomatic intervention, primarily from the United States, as a reason why the government is seeking to legalize more religious groups.

=== Restrictions on religious freedom ===
The constitutional right of freedom of belief and religion continued to be interpreted and enforced unevenly. In some areas local officials allowed relatively wide latitude to believers; in other provinces members of unrecognized religious groups were sometimes subject to harassment from local officials. Government practices and bureaucratic impediments placed some restrictions on religious freedom and growth, although in many areas Buddhists, Catholics, Protestants, Hòa Hảo, Cao Đài, as well as the government itself, reported an increase in religious activity and observance. Officially recognized religious groups faced limitations in obtaining teaching materials, expanding training facilities, building new houses of worship, publishing religious materials, and expanding the number of clergy in religious training in response to increased demand from congregations. However, the government continued to ease limitations compared to previous years.

Because of the lack of due process in the legal system and inconsistent high-level oversight, the actions of religious adherents can be subject to the discretion of local officials in their respective jurisdictions. In some cases, local officials reportedly told religious leaders that national-level laws do not apply to their jurisdictions. In other cases, different provinces applied the same laws differently. For example, the Central Highlands province of Gia Lai closely followed government policy and registered all of the SECV "meeting points" in the province pending their future recognition. However, in neighboring Đắk Lắk and Bình Phước provinces, many SECV "meeting points" remained unregistered. In certain cases recognized and unrecognized Protestant groups were able to overcome local harassment or overturn negative local decisions when they have appealed to higher-level authorities.

During the reporting period, obstacles to religious growth and training remained. These included impediments to registration for Protestant congregations in northern Vietnam, an unresolved ECVN property claim that has prevented the establishment of a pastors training facility, failure by Dien Bien provincial authorities to register their local Catholic diocese, failure of Hà Giang authorities to grant legal residency to a parish priest, restrictions by the authorities in Thừa Thiên–Huế Province on Catholic seminary recruitment and Baptist Church property claims, and legal restrictions on proselytizing. In some provinces house churches were required to submit lists of all worshipers as part of the registration process in contravention of the legal framework on religion. This phenomenon appeared to be widespread in the Mekong Delta but has been noted elsewhere in the country, including in north-central Thanh Hóa Province. In some cases the authorities removed this requirement following the protests of the registering groups; in other cases the requirement was maintained, impeding the registration process.

The Government continued to ban and actively discourage participation in certain unrecognized religious groups, including the outlawed UBCV and some Protestant, Hòa Hảo, and Cao Đài groups.

The government requires all Buddhist monks to be approved by and work under the officially recognized Buddhist organization, the Vietnam Buddhist Sangha (VBS). The number of Buddhist student monks is controlled and limited by the Committee on Religious Affairs, although the number of Buddhist academies at the local and provincial levels has increased in recent years in addition to several university-equivalent academies.

In the Mekong Delta, reliable information indicated that at least 10 ethnic Khmer monks were derobed and subjected to disciplinary action, including detention and pagoda arrest, for participation in a protest or protests against the authorities in early 2007.

The government continued to oppose efforts by the outlawed UBCV to operate and continued to restrict the movement of UBCV leaders. In August 2006 the government allowed Thích Huyền Quang to travel to Ho Chi Minh City for 2 months for medical treatment but discouraged him from returning to Ho Chi Minh City in 2007. However, Thích Quảng Độ and Thích Huyền Quang were able to receive visits from foreign diplomats. Thích Quảng Độ was on occasion able to see other UBCV members during the period covered by this report. Thích Quảng Độ and some other UBCV leaders also were able to maintain contact with associates overseas. However, provincial leaders of the UBCV throughout southern Vietnam came under pressure. In one case a nun on the representative board of the UBCV in Khánh Hòa Province faced severe harassment beginning in March 2006 and reportedly was forced out of the pagoda she founded. UBCV chapters in central Vietnam were able to gather to celebrate Buddha's birthday in May 2006 and May 2007, but its leaders in HCMC and in Bình Định province were unable to organize similar celebrations.

The government technically maintains veto power over Vatican appointments of bishops and exercised that veto authority over the nomination of two bishops in early 2007. For the most part, however, the government has in practice cooperated with the Catholic Church in nominations for bishops' appointments. The Church operates 6 seminaries in the country, with more than 1,000 students enrolled, as well as a new special training program for "older" students. All students must be approved by local authorities for enrolling in a seminary and again prior to their ordination as priests. The Church believed that the number of students being ordained remained insufficient to support the growing Catholic population and indicated it would like to open additional seminaries and enroll new classes more frequently; however, it received no official response from the government.

The government continued to remain concerned that some ethnic minority groups active in this region were operating a self-styled "Dega Church", which reportedly mixes religious practice with political activism and calls for ethnic minority separatism. This factor complicated and slowed the registration and recognition process for other churches in the Central Highlands.

Despite improved conditions over the reporting period, SECV and house churches in the Central Highlands provinces of Đắk Lắk, Gia Lai, Kon Tum, and Đắk Nông continue to be under close government scrutiny.

A number of Protestant house church organizations, including the Baptists, Presbyterians, and United World Mission Church, also operated in the Central Highlands. These groups reported substantially improved conditions for their congregations.

The Government continued its oversight and, with varying degrees of success, exerted control over religious hierarchies, organized religious activities, and other activities of religious groups through Committees for Religious Affairs at the national and provincial levels.

Several hundred ECVN congregations applied to register during the reporting period; however, most applications remained pending or were rejected, at least initially. Reasons cited for registration rejections, more often than not, included bureaucratic impediments, such as incorrect application procedures or forms, or incomplete information. Less frequently, local authorities cited vague security concerns, saying either that their political authority could be threatened or that confrontations could occur between traditional believers and recently converted Christians in a certain geographic area. Despite some registrations in the Northwest Highlands during the reporting period, much work remained in processing both Protestant and Catholic registrations there.

The Hòa Hảo have faced some restrictions on their religious and political activities since 1975, in part because of lingering Communist Party suspicions stemming from the Hòa Hảo's armed opposition to communist forces dating back to French colonial rule. After 1975, all administrative offices, places of worship, and social and cultural institutions connected to the Hòa Hảo faith were closed. Believers continued to practice their religion at home, but the lack of access to public gathering places contributed to the Hòa Hảo community's isolation and fragmentation. In 1999, a new official Hòa Hảo body, the Hòa Hảo Administrative Council, was formed. In the spring of 2005, the Hòa Hảo Administrative Council was expanded and renamed the Executive Committee of Hòa Hảo Buddhism. Several leaders of the Hòa Hảo community, including several pre-1975 leaders, openly criticized the Committee. They claimed that the committee was subservient to the government and demanded official recognition, instead, of their own Hòa Hảo body, the Hòa Hảo Central Buddhist Church (HHCBC). Although still unregistered, on May 4, 2005, the HHCBC held an organizational meeting that was attended by 126 delegates from across the southern part of the country. However, its members faced significant official repression.

Frictions between some Hòa Hảo activists and government officials in the Mekong Delta continued during the reporting period.

In May 2007 a court in the Mekong Delta province of Đồng Tháp sentenced four Hòa Hảo followers to between 4 and 6 years in prison for "creating public disorder" under article 245 of the 1999 Penal Code. The four were arrested for their involvement in a June 2006 hunger strike protesting the arrest and imprisonment of other Hòa Hảo sect members in 2005 as well as more general allegations of government suppression of the Hòa Hảo faith.

Eight Cao Đài believers were imprisoned in July 2005 for up to 13 years for "fleeing abroad to oppose the government" and "propagating documents against the Vietnamese Government to incite demonstrations and riots." The group had attempted to protest government control over the Cao Đài church in September 2004 in Phnom Penh but were arrested and expelled to Vietnam.

There are no formal prohibitions on changing one's religion. However, formal conversions appear to be relatively rare, apart from those that occur when non-Catholics marry Catholics. Many converts may find the conversion procedures overly cumbersome or fear government retribution. There were isolated reports that local officials in rural communities continued to discourage conversion to Protestantism by threatening converts that they would lose education and social welfare allowances. A national CRA-produced training manual for local officials being used in the north was found to contain language telling officials to encourage recent religious converts to return to their traditional beliefs. The government has pledged to diplomats and foreign representatives that it would revise the problematic language, acknowledging that it may not have been in compliance with regulations.

The government controls and monitors all forms of public assembly, including assembly for religious activities; however, during the reporting period, some large religious gatherings were allowed.

Article 35 of Decree 22 requires government approval for foreign missionary groups to proselytize. Such activities should take place under the sponsorship of a national or local religious organization. It discourages public proselytizing outside of recognized worship centers, including by citizens. Some missionaries visited the country despite this official prohibition and carried on informal proselytizing activities.

In April 2006 the Ho Chi Minh City-based New Life Fellowship (NLF) was able to hold its first large prayer meeting for foreigners since August 2005 on the grounds of a Ho Chi Minh City hotel. The NLF, which catered to both foreigners and citizens and is headed by a foreign missionary, was prevented from gathering in Ho Chi Minh City hotels in August 2005 after it launched and advertised services for local citizens in contravention to the law. Since then, foreigners in the NLF were able to gather in smaller groups at home. The NLF remained in discussion with city- and national-level officials to find a permanent, legal solution to its status. Other expatriate-only groups did not face any government harassment. At least one expatriate church group received a formal operating license from the HCMC government in mid-2007.

Government policy does not permit persons who belong to unofficial religious groups to speak publicly about their beliefs, but some continued to conduct religious training and services without harassment. Members of registered religious organizations are permitted to speak about their beliefs and attempt to persuade others to adopt their religions in recognized places of worship but are discouraged from doing so elsewhere.

The government requires all religious publishing to be done by the Religious Publishing House, which is a part of the Office of Religious Affairs, or by other government-approved publishing houses after the Government first approves the proposed items. The Religious Publishing House printed 130 new religious titles during the reporting period, including Bibles in two Central Highlands ethnic languages. A range of Bibles, Buddhist sacred scriptures, and other religious texts and publications are printed by these organizations and are distributed openly. The Religious Publishing House has printed 250,000 copies of parts of the Hòa Hảo sacred scriptures, along with 100,000 volumes featuring the founder's teachings and prophesies; however, Hòa Hảo believers reported that the government continued to restrict the distribution of the full scriptures, specifically the poetry of the founder. The official Hòa Hảo Representative Committee cited a lack of funds, not government restrictions, as the reason why the Hòa Hảo scriptures had not been published in full. The Bible is printed in Vietnamese, Chinese, Ede, Jarai, and English. However, in January 2007 authorities seized Bibles and other religious materials that were printed abroad, belonging to a Protestant house church group in HCMC, on the grounds that any "foreign language" material that has not been explicitly authorized by the government is illegal. The group later purchased government-approved bibles for distribution.

The government allows travel for religious purposes, but the approval of authorities is required for participation in religious conferences and training courses abroad. Muslims are able to undertake the Hajj, and Buddhist, Catholic, and Protestant officials have generally been able to travel abroad for study and for conferences. Other unofficial leaders travel internationally on a regular basis. Religious persons who traveled abroad in the past were sometimes questioned about their activities upon their return and required to surrender their passports; however, this practice appeared to be becoming more infrequent.

Religious affiliation is indicated on citizens' national identification cards and in "family books", which are household identification documents. In practice, many citizens who consider themselves religious do not indicate this on their identification cards, and government statistics list them as nonreligious. While it is possible to change the entry for religion on national identification cards, many converts may find the procedures overly cumbersome or fear government retribution. The Government does not designate persons' religions on passports.

The government allows, and in some cases encourages, links between officially recognized religious bodies and coreligionists in other countries; however, the government actively discourages contacts between the UBCV and its foreign Buddhist supporters.

Contacts between some unregistered Protestant organizations and their foreign supporters are discouraged but occur regularly, including training and the provision of financial support and religious materials. The Government remained concerned about contact between separatist "Dega" Protestants in the Central Highlands and overseas supporters. The Government regards Dega Protestants as a group that uses religion as a rallying point to encourage ethnic minority separatism, political unrest, and the establishment of an independent ethnic minority state.

Adherence to a religious faith generally does not disadvantage persons in nongovernment civil, economic, and secular life, although it likely would prevent advancement to higher CPV, government, and military ranks. The military does not have a chaplaincy. Avowed religious practice was formerly a bar to membership in the CPV, but now the CPV claims that tens of thousands of the more than three million Communist Party members are religious believers. Clergy and believers of various faiths serve in local and provincial government positions and are represented on the National Assembly. CPV and government officials routinely visit pagodas, temples, and churches, making a special point to visit Protestant churches over Christmas.

The 2005 Implementing Decree for the Ordinance on Religion and Belief stipulates that provincial People's Committees must approve the construction of new religious facilities. The renovation or upgrade of religious facilities also requires notification of authorities, although not necessarily a permit, depending on the extent of the renovation. The Decree stipulates that authorities must respond to a construction permit application within 20 days.

The government does not permit religious instruction in public schools; however, it permits clergy to teach at universities in subjects in which they are qualified. Buddhist monks have lectured at the Ho Chi Minh Political Academy, the main Communist Party school. Several Catholic nuns and at least one Catholic priest teach at Ho Chi Minh City universities. They are not allowed to wear religious dress when they teach or to identify themselves as clergy. Catholic, Protestant, Muslim, and Buddhist groups are allowed to provide religious education to children. Catholic religious education, on weekends or evenings, is permitted in most areas and has increased in recent years in churches throughout the country. Khmer Theravada Buddhists and Cham Muslims regularly hold religious and language classes outside of normal classroom hours in their respective pagodas and mosques. Religious groups are not permitted to operate independent schools beyond preschool and kindergarten.

Provincial authorities have returned a limited number of church properties confiscated following the reunification of the country in 1975 and remained in protracted discussions on other properties. One of the vice chairmen of the government-recognized VBS stated that approximately 30 percent of Buddhist properties confiscated in Ho Chi Minh City were returned, and from 5 to 10 percent of all Buddhist properties confiscated in the south have been returned. Catholic and recognized Protestant organizations obtained a small number of previously confiscated properties, but continued to have ongoing disputes with officials over others. The SECV estimated more than 250 properties for which it seeks restitution; other Protestant denominations active in southern Vietnam pre-1975 also had property claims. Some properties were returned to the Hòa Hảo Administrative Council, but few Cao Đài properties were returned, according to church leaders. Many of the properties seized in the past were religious schools and hospitals that were incorporated into the state system.

Although the Ordinance on Religion and Belief encourages religious organizations to conduct charitable activities in education and healthcare, the degree of government oversight of these activities varied greatly among localities. In some areas, especially in the south, Catholic priests and nuns operated kindergartens, orphanages, vocational training centers, and clinics and engaged in a variety of other humanitarian projects. In Ho Chi Minh City and Huế, the Catholic Church was involved in supporting HIV/AIDS hospices and treatment centers and providing counseling to young persons. Buddhist groups also were involved in HIV/AIDS and other charitable work across the country. The Ho Chi Minh City archdiocese ran the HIV/AIDS clinic at the Trong Diệm drug rehabilitation center on behalf of the city government. The city government and the Catholic Church remained in discussion about how to officially approve new initiatives, such as a walk-in clinic for possible HIV/AIDS victims, but it allowed the Church to pursue these initiatives quietly. Charitable activities by the Catholic Church were much more restricted in northern Vietnam, but during the reporting period, a number of northern provinces were reported to have become more permissive. Thái Bình Province, for example, actively encouraged the Catholic Church's work in HIV/AIDS and the treatment of the sick and disabled. Haiphong authorities also began working with the Catholic Church in areas related to drug addiction treatment and HIV/AIDS during the reporting period. Thanh Hóa Province has engaged its Catholic Diocese on religious infrastructure and general reconstruction programs. The Province of Hanoi allowed a number of VBS-run temples to run orphanages for abandoned and disabled children, as well as treatment programs for those that suffer from HIV/AIDS.

The VBS engaged in humanitarian activities, including antidrug and child welfare programs, in many parts of the country. The officially recognized Hòa Hảo organization also reported that it engaged in numerous charitable activities and local development projects during the reporting period.

=== Abuses of religious freedom ===
Reports of abuses of religious freedom continued to diminish during the period covered by this report; however, some religious believers continued to experience harassment or repression because they operated without legal sanction. In a number of isolated instances, local officials repressed Protestant believers in some parts of the Central and Northwest Highlands and other areas by forcing church gatherings to cease, closing house churches, and pressuring individuals to renounce their religious beliefs, often unsuccessfully.

Some ethnic minority worshipers in the Central Highlands—particularly in areas suspected to be affiliated with the "Dega Church"—continue to be prevented from gathering to worship. However, the number of credible reports of incidents was significantly lower compared with previous years and appeared to reflect individual bias at the local level rather than official central government policy. In a number of instances, the local officials involved were reprimanded or fired.

Restrictions on UBCV leaders remained in place, with much of the leadership's freedom of movement, expression, and assembly limited. There were fewer credible reports that officials arbitrarily detained, physically intimidated, and harassed persons based, at least in part, on their religious beliefs and practice, particularly in mountainous ethnic minority areas.

In early 2007 local authorities in Bến Tre Province refused to register a Protestant house church; police subsequently sought to prevent the church group from gathering. According to religious leaders, a house church in Trà Vinh Province in the Mekong Delta was prevented from holding Easter services in 2006. Bibles and other religious materials were confiscated. In Kiên Giang in January 2006 police banned the gathering of a house church affiliated with the Methodist community and confiscated identification documents of a visiting pastor. In December 2005 police interrupted Christmas services of some house churches in Cần Thơ, Long An, and Vĩnh Long provinces, also in the Mekong Delta. In May 2005 Protestant House Church preacher Nguyen Van Cam told a reporter that local authorities in Dong Lam Commune of Tiền Hải District, Thái Bình Province, had tried on several occasions to convince him to sign documents committing him to stop holding house church services.

In June 2006, in Thanh Hóa Province, two Protestant worshippers were beaten by local police. In December 2006 local police reportedly beat Evangelist believers at a house church gathering in Quảng Ninh Province. Also, in December 2006 local authorities aggressively broke up a meeting with students at an ECVN congregation house church in Thừa Thiên–Huế Province.

Baptist pastor Than Van Truong was released in September 2005 after spending one year involuntarily committed to a mental asylum by authorities in Đồng Nai Province as punishment for his religious and political beliefs. He was reportedly released on the condition that he sign a document certifying his mental illness, making him subject to readmission to a mental institution should he "relapse". Pastor Truong continued to be closely monitored by local officials. There were confirmed reports that he continued to be harassed and his religious activities curtailed in Đồng Nai and in his home village in Bắc Giang Province in northern Vietnam where he has helped organize a small church. In June 2006 diplomats were permitted by the government to visit the Bắc Giang church and to investigate allegations of harassment with local officials.

Protestant pastor and house church leader Nguyen Hong Quang was imprisoned in 2004 and released in September 2005 in an official amnesty. In May 2006 Pastor Quang and some followers were detained for nearly 24 hours following a confrontation with local police over new construction at Pastor Quang's house, which also served as a local house church. However, the government's claim that Pastor Quang willfully ignored zoning regulations and local officials' orders to comply with zoning regulations was supported by evidence.

In August 2005 there were credible reports that local officials attempted to force an SECV lay preacher to renounce his faith and stop his ministry in the ethnic minority H're village in Quảng Ngãi Province. Unidentified parties reportedly burned his house down in retaliation. The small Protestant community continued to face harassment through May 2006. However, following central Government intervention, the harassment appeared to cease and one of the two preachers involved in the dispute was allowed to attend an SECV pastoral training course.

During this reporting period, there were few credible reports of leaders of nonregistered churches in the Central and Northwest Highlands being harassed or detained and pressured to renounce their faith.

The dissemination of the legal framework on religion has remained a slow process, especially in northern Vietnam and the Northwest Highlands, and through the end of the period covered by this report, many leaders of places of worship reported that police and other authorities had not implemented fully these legal codes. During the reporting period, some Protestants in the northern and Northwest Highlands provinces reported that local officials often used legal pretexts to prevent religious registration.

In early June 2007, local ECVN congregants in Bát Xát District in Lào Cai Province reported that local government authorities, including members of a Border Protection special task force, came to the district to conduct training on the Legal Framework laws. According to the congregants, local authorities imposed fines of up to approximately $100 (1.7 million Dong VND) on eight "illegal Protestants" and imposed material fines (apparently confiscating chickens) on nine others. The "illegal Protestants" were accused of following Protestantism without seeking permission from provincial authorities.

In March 2006 in Vị Xuyên District of Hà Giang, local authorities fined a house church pastor $32 (VND 500,000), or more than half of his monthly salary, for traveling to Hanoi to pick up registration forms from the ECVN. In addition, lay deacons of the church were fined $6 (VND 100,000) each for "being Protestant" and for signing documents requesting registration for their group.

In January 2006 in Xín Mần District of Hà Giang Province, district-level authorities told an unregistered Protestant congregation, "If five or more of your members gather together, we will prosecute you." The group submitted an application to register but had not received any official response to their request.

Despite significant improvements in the Central Highlands, SECV congregations in some districts of Đắk Lắk Province faced some restrictions on operations. Conditions appeared even more restrictive in Sa Thầy District in Kon Tum Province, where senior district-level officials in early 2006 argued that there was "no religion" in the area, although more recent reports from Kon Tum indicate that the situation there is improving. There were indications that, at least in some cases, more senior government officials intervened and rebuked local authorities for harassing house churches in contravention of the Prime Minister's Instruction on Protestantism. In a few incidents in the Mekong Delta, local authorities reportedly increased harassment of groups that submitted applications to register.

Although stating that regular and systematic Government interference of their religious services had stopped since 2004, members of the United Gospel Outreach Church (UGOC) in southern Long An Province still claimed harassment from local level officials in a meeting with the Ambassador in August 2006. In June 2006, the owners of four UGOC house churches were briefly detained on the grounds that it was illegal for an unregistered church to hold services. The UGOC in Long An is unable to hold regular overnight religious retreats, to get permission to hold gatherings for 50 or more persons, or to hold regular bible training classes. UGOC members claim they can publish and disseminate religious materials "if done quietly."

In June 2007 a group of 150 pastors of the Inter-Evangelistic Movement Bible Church (IEM) were detained on buses for several hours by southern Bình Phước Province authorities after a prayer gathering of 2,000 followers. Local authorities complained to and questioned leaders about their "evangelizing and organization of a large crowd without a permit." The group was later allowed to return to HCMC, and the head of the Provincial CRA offered to assist in IEM's provincial registration applications.

It has been even more difficult for IEM followers in several locations in northwest Điện Biên Province, where police actively broke up meetings of worshippers, and authorities refused to register IEM meeting points. Followers there submitted credible reports that they were forced to "meet secretly at night, in the fields" in order to pray. Local authorities also actively pressured IEM followers there to abandon their faith and return to traditional beliefs. This has continued on and off for several years.

It was difficult to determine the exact number of religious detainees and religious prisoners because there was little transparency in the justice system, and it was very difficult to obtain confirmation of when persons were detained, imprisoned, tried, or released. The government claimed that it did not hold any religious prisoners; such persons were usually convicted of violating national security laws or general criminal laws. Some observers estimate a high number of religious prisoners, generally as a result of including individuals arrested for participation in "Dega" groups or in the clashes between police and ethnic minority protestors in February 2001 and April 2004. The Government, as well as many official and unofficial religious leaders, depicted the protests as being motivated by disputes over land or other socioeconomic grievances rather than religious concerns. Determining the facts in these cases is extremely difficult.

At least 15 individuals, including UBCV monks Thích Huyền Quang and Thích Quảng Độ and Catholic priest Pham Van Loi, were held in conditions resembling house arrest for reasons related primarily to their political beliefs or attempts to form nonauthorized organizations, despite the apparent lack of any official charges against them. The movement of a number of other UBCV, Cao Đài, Catholic, Hòa Hảo, and Protestant dignitaries and believers was restricted or was watched and followed by police. Two members of the HHCBC, Tran Van Thang and Tran Van Hoang, were arrested on February 25, 2005, and sentenced to 6 and 9 months' imprisonment respectively "for producing and distributing 'illegal' recordings of the Hòa Hảo faith." In addition, they were fined $1,640 (26 million VND) each.

With Ma Van Bay's release in September 2006, all individuals raised by the United States as prisoners of concern for reasons connected to their faith were freed by the government.

=== Forced religious conversion ===
The Implementing Decree of the Ordinance on Religion and Belief states, "Acts to force citizens to follow a religion or renounce their faith...are not allowed." The Prime Minister's Instruction on Protestantism contains a similarly worded statement. While Government officials stated that forced conversions or renunciation of faith had always been illegal, these were the first legal documents to state so explicitly. Religious contacts from the Central and Northwest Highlands reported that attempted forced renunciations continued to decrease. A few incidents were reported during the period covered by this report.

Local officials in several northwestern villages continued to attempt to convince or force H'mong Protestants to recant their faith. Local authorities encouraged clan elders to pressure members of their extended families to cease practicing Christianity and to return to traditional practices. Similarly, in May 2006, authorities in Cha Cang Commune, Mường Lay District, northern Điện Biên Province, reportedly pressured believers from several Protestant house churches to construct traditional altars in their homes and to sign documents renouncing Protestantism.

In March 2007 credible reports cited that police in East Điện Biên District of Điện Biên Province were involved in separate incidents: hitting an IEM pastor, banning IEM worshippers from gathering, confiscating religious materials, fining some followers and forcing others to cut wood, and going to IEM followers' individual homes to pressure them to abandon their faith. In one incident local police reportedly told followers that "believing in Christ is to believe in the United States."

In April 2007 other credible reports cite that police in Minh Hóa District in northern Quảng Bình Province confiscated Bibles from IEM followers and pressured followers to abandon their faith, telling them reportedly that Protestantism "was a bad American religion".

There were no reports of forced religious conversion of minor U.S. citizens who had been abducted or illegally removed from the United States or of the refusal to allow such citizens to be returned to the United States.

=== Improvements and positive developments in respect for religious freedom ===
The status of respect for religious freedom improved significantly during the period covered by this report. Compared to previous years, the government continued to ease limitations on restrictions placed upon Buddhists, Catholics, Protestants, Hòa Hảo, Baháʼí, and Caodaists. The government nationally registered the Baháʼí Faith in March 2007, and the organization would be eligible for national recognition in 2008. Much of the change came from stronger implementation of significant revisions to the legal framework governing religion instituted in 2004 and 2005 and a more positive government attitude toward Protestant groups. Many recognized and unrecognized religious groups, especially Protestant groups in the Central and Northwest Highlands regions, reported that the situation for their practitioners continued to improve overall. In addition, the central Government continued to actively train, inform, and encourage provincial and local authorities to comply with regulations under the legal framework on religion.

During the period covered by this report, SECV-affiliated churches and house churches generally reported improved conditions in the Central Highlands provinces of Đắk Lắk, Gia Lai, Kon Tum, and Đắk Nông. At least 45 new Protestant SECV congregations "meeting points" in the Central Highlands and Bình Phước Province were registered or recognized in the period covered by this report.

Most SECV congregations and meeting places in the Central Highlands were able to register their activities with local officials and allowed to operate without significant harassment. For example, hundreds of places of worship were allowed to operate in Gia Lai, effectively legalizing operations for tens of thousands of believers in the province. The SECV also opened a number of new churches in Gia Lai, Đắk Lắk, and Đắk Nông Provinces. In addition, the SECV continued to conduct Bible classes in these provinces to provide training to preachers in the region, allowing them to receive formal recognition as pastors. Ordination of new pastors is a key step in the formal recognition of additional SECV churches. Gia Lai authorities also facilitated the construction of a new SECV church in Chư Sê District. In May 2006, 266 leaders attended a session in Huế conducted by the CRA that explained the registration process, and another 300 attended a similar conference in Ho Chi Minh City.

By early 2007 there were more than 800 SECV "meeting points" registered in the Central Highlands and another approximately 150 registered places of worship affiliated with other religious organizations in the region. Seventy-one SECV pastors and newly appointed pastors were recognized. In August 2006 a new Protestant training center was approved and opened in Ho Chi Minh City.

Officials in most of the northern provinces acknowledged the presence of Protestants and stated that, in keeping with the government's instructions, they planned to expedite registration of some congregations. Of approximately 1,000 Protestant congregations that have submitted applications to register, only 40 have been approved; however, ECVN contacts in the Northwest Highlands confirmed that most unregistered congregations were allowed to worship in their homes and to meet openly during the daytime, with the full knowledge of authorities—a marked improvement from the past.

Police and other government officials in the Northwest Highlands worked with house church leaders in some areas to inform them of the new regulations. The CRA conducted training sessions across the north to educate provincial and district officials about the new religious regulations so that they would "implement these policies in an orderly fashion." The CRA also conducted training seminars for religious leaders. In April 2006, 247 clergy participants from various religious groups attended a seminar in Hanoi conducted by the CRA that explained the registration process.

Many pastors of Protestant denominations such as the Seventh-day Adventists, Mennonites, Baptists, United Gospel Outreach Church, and Assemblies of God preferred not to join the SECV or ECVN because of doctrinal differences. In many parts of the country, particularly in urban areas, these and other unrecognized Protestant organizations reported that they were able to practice openly and with the knowledge of local officials. While there were exceptions, the level of official harassment of unrecognized house churches from non-SECV and ECVN denominations continued to decline across the country. The Government held discussions about registration and recognition with leaders of a number of Protestant denominations, The Church of Jesus Christ of Latter-day Saints, and the Jehovah's Witnesses.

Attendance at religious services continued to increase during the period covered by this report. The number of Buddhist monks, Protestant pastors, and Catholic priests also continued to increase, and restrictions on church services for Protestants continued to diminish. Catholics across the country were allowed to celebrate Christmas and Easter without interference. A handful of Protestant congregations in the Central Highlands and in the north had difficulty celebrating during the Christmas season but reported that they were allowed to celebrate Easter without problems. In early 2007, IEM leaders claimed that authorities prevented their Christmas 2006 celebrations in central Quảng Ngãi Province. However, IEM stated that overall their operations in Southern and Central Vietnam were more stable and followers were allowed to worship regularly at 11 meeting points.

The Catholic Church reported continued easing of government control over Church assignment of new clergy, and, many new priests were ordained. Contact between Vatican authorities and the country's Catholics was enhanced with reciprocal official visits between the Vatican and the government. The Government maintained its regular, active dialogue with the Vatican on a range of concerns, such as diplomatic normalization, Church leadership, organizational activities, and interfaith dialogue.

At least one expatriate church group received a formal operating license from the HCMC government in mid-2007.

France-based Buddhist leader Thich Nhat Hanh was again permitted to return to the country in April 2007. He traveled widely through the country, met with large groups of Buddhist adherents, and spoke to intellectuals and political leaders, including President Nguyễn Minh Triết.

During the reporting period, some religious groups were also allowed to convene large religious gatherings, such as the Catholic celebrations at the La Vang Catholic sanctuary, traditional pilgrimage events such as the Hùng Kings' Festival, Buddhist ceremonies in Huế, and the Hòa Hảo Founding Day and commemoration of the founder's death, each with attendance estimated in the tens of thousands or more. House church Protestants were able to gather in large groups for special worship services in Ho Chi Minh City and elsewhere. Ho Chi Minh City officials also facilitated large Christmas and Easter celebrations by a variety of Protestant denominations.

Catholic and Protestant groups reported that the government continued to restore some previously owned properties, although progress on outstanding claims was generally very slow.

In January 2006 an ECVN congregation was given title to a church property in Thanh Hóa that had stood derelict for several decades. The congregation was also given permission to remodel the church and build a house for their pastor.

The Government continued to publicize its new policy of religious tolerance through the organs of the state. The CRA continued to train more provincial propaganda cadres from the Northwest Highlands to disseminate information on religion to reduce societal tensions arising between followers of traditional ethnic minority beliefs and Protestant converts.

== Societal abuses and discrimination ==
There are no known instances of societal discrimination or violence based on religion, even during the period covered by this report. In Ho Chi Minh City, Hanoi, Huế and other Vietnamese cities, it's common to see ecumenical dialogues among leaders of disparate religious communities. While the Communist Government of Vietnam has remained skeptical towards religion, having emplaced various restrictions on religious practice and registration of religious groups, Vietnamese people tend to have a tolerant perception towards different religious groups, with there having been only a few cases of anti-religious violence in recent years regarding Governmental issues and/or problems. In particular, Christians, Buddhists, Hòa Hảo, Cao Đài, Muslims, Pagans and Hindus often cooperate on social and charitable projects.

On November 19, 2006, the Catholic Archdiocese of Hanoi and the ECVN held an historic ecumenical service at Cua Bac Church in Hanoi on the occasion of the visit of President Bush. New cooperative efforts between the two groups resulted from this effort.

The growth of Protestantism in the Central Highlands is complicated by the presence of "Degar" separatists, who advocate an autonomous or independent homeland for the indigenous persons who live in the area, particularly in Gia Lai, Đắk Nông, and Đắk Lắk provinces. These separatists are reported to have links to political advocacy groups residing in the United States and Canada belonged to Degar minority. The relationship between the Degar movement and Protestant believers belonging to the SECV is tense in some parts of the Central Highlands. Dega activists reportedly have threatened that SECV pastors would not be allowed to serve in a "Degar State" unless they abandon the SECV. Other Protestant pastors have accused the Degar movement of manipulating religion for political purposes.

In a widely publicized case during the reporting period, vandals, who turned out to be local Party officials and policemen, destroyed a Pietà statue in Dong Dinh Parish, Nho Quan District, in Ninh Bình Province. This was largely related to a local political dispute. Provincial authorities responded quickly to the vandalism, and 10 local Party officials were arrested, relieved of duty, and ordered to pay restitution to the Catholic Phat Diệm Diocese. The local Bishop refused the financial restitution, but the statue was later restored in May 2007 with donations from local Catholics.

Such anti-Catholic incidents are relatively rare and uncommon in the country. However, recently, Catholics in Vietnam have become the target of attacks on social networks, when they complained about the appearance of negative comments and articles discriminating against Catholics from a few anonymous accounts and forums.

Vietnam is also the home of the largest Christian statue in Asian continent, the Christ of Vũng Tàu depicting Jesus in the city of Vũng Tàu. It is seen as another symbol of religious tolerance in the country. The largest Islamic mosque in the country, the Kahramanlar Rahmet Mosque, funded by Turkey, was opened in 2017 is also perceived as a sign of religious tolerance in the country.

== See also ==
- Religion in Vietnam
- Human rights in Vietnam

== Sources ==
- United States Bureau of Democracy, Human Rights and Labor. "Vietnam: International Religious Freedom Report 2007". This article incorporates text from this source, which is in the public domain.
- United Kingdom Home Office. "Country Information and Guidance. Vietnam: Religious minority groups" (2014).
