= Buddhist surname =

Shi

Chinese name
- Traditional Chinese: 釋
- Simplified Chinese: 释
Transcriptions
Standard Mandarin
- Hanyu Pinyin: Shì
- Wade–Giles: Shih^{4}
Yue: Cantonese
- Jyutping: Sik^{1}

Vietnamese name
- Vietnamese: Thích

Korean name
- Hangul: 석
Transcriptions
- Revised Romanization: Seok
- McCune–Reischauer: Sŏk

Japanese name
- Hiragana: しゃく
- Shinjitai: 釈
Transcriptions
- Romanization: Shaku

In East Asian Buddhism, monks and nuns usually adopt a Buddhist surname and a Dharma name, which are combined in the surname-first East-Asian naming order. Since the 4th century the standard Buddhist surname has been Shi (Chinese: 釋, Korean: Seok, Vietnamese: Thích, Japanese: Shaku), which is the first syllable of Shijiamouni, the Chinese word for Shakyamuni. This practice was introduced by the Jin dynasty (266–420) monk Dao'an in around 370, when he stayed in Xiangyang, and became general practice in China after 385. Previously Chinese monks and nuns used several other Buddhist surnames, typically designating the ethnonational origin of their foreign preceptors.

The most notable early surname was Zhu (Chinese: 竺; pinyin: Zhú; Wade–Giles: Chu^{2}; Jyutping: Zuk^{1}), which came from Tianzhu (the Chinese word for India). Jingjian (292–361) or Zhu Jingjian was the first nun of China. Daosheng (c. 360–434) or Zhu Daosheng was one of the last influential monks to use Zhu rather than Shi.

Other Buddhist surnames included:

- Zhi (Chinese: 支) which came from Yuezhi or its successor state, the Kushan Empire. Examples include Zhi Qian and Zhi Dun.
- An (Chinese: 安) which came from Anxi (the Chinese word for Arsacid). Examples include An Xuan and An Shigao.
- Yu (Chinese: 于) which came from Yutian (the Chinese word for Khotan).
- Kang (Chinese: 康) which was a designation for Sogdiana. An example is Kang Senghui.
- Bo (Chinese: 帛) which came from the Chinese word for the surname of several Kucha kings, Bo (Chinese: 白).

The adoption of a Buddhist surname signifies the ordinand's severance of family bonds and their full devotion to the teachings of the Buddha.
