= 2015 GPL season =

- League: Garena Premier League
- Sport: League of Legends
- Duration: 10 December – 12 April (Spring); 24 June – 9 August (Summer); 15–16 August (Regional Finals)
- Teams: 16

Spring Split
- Champions: (Vietnam) Saigon Fantastic Five
- Runners-up: (Thailand) Bangkok Titans

Summer Split
- Champions: (Thailand) Bangkok Titans
- Runners-up: (Vietnam) Saigon Jokers

Regional Finals
- Champions: (Thailand) Bangkok Titans
- Runners-up: (Vietnam) Saigon Jokers

GPL seasons
- ← 2014 2016 →

The 2015 GPL season was the fourth edition of the Garena Premier League, a Riot Games-organised tournament for League of Legends, the multiplayer online battle arena video game. It is a fully professional League of Legends league in the Southeast Asia region, with 16 teams from 5 countries/areas to determine which team is the best in the region.

== Spring ==
=== Format ===
- Group Stage #1

- 16 teams divided into 4 groups of 4 (8 Seeded, 8 Unseeded)
- Double Round Robin, Each match is Best of Two.

- 2:0 Winning team receives 3 points.
- 1:1 Both teams receive 1 point.

- Top 2 teams from each group advance to Group Stage 2.

- All Ties Broken by Head-to-Head Record

- Leading team in 4 group at GPL Spring 2015 after week 4 will be qualified to participate Taipei IEM play-off

- Group Stage #2

- 8 teams divided into 2 groups of 4 (4 Seeded, 4 Unseeded)
- Double Round Robin, Each match is Best of Two.

- 2:0 Winning team receives 3 points.
- 1:1 Both teams receive 1 point.

- Top 2 teams from each group advance to Playoffs.

- All Ties Broken by Head-to-Head Record

- Play-off

- Four teams participate
- Both 1st place teams from Group Stage #2 plays 2nd place from the other group in the semifinals
- Matches are best of five
- Winner qualifies for the IWCI 2015
- Finalists qualify for the SEA Finals

==== Qualifications ====
Countries	Slot	League
Vietnam	6	GPL Vietnamese Promotion
Singapore/Malaysia	4	TLC Summer Grand Finals
Philippines	3	PGS Summer
Thailand	2	Thailand Grand Championship; TPL Summer
Indonesia	1	LGS Season 1

=== Qualified teams ===
Counties	League	Team(s)	ID
Vietnam	VCSA	(Vietnam) Saigon Jokers	SAJ
Vietnam	VCSA	(Vietnam) 269 Gaming	269
Vietnam	VCSA	(Vietnam) Saigon Fantastic Five	SF5
Vietnam	VCSA	(Vietnam) ASUS Fate	ASF
Vietnam	VCSA	(Vietnam) Full Louis	HFL
Vietnam	VCSA	(Vietnam) Ultimate	UTM
Philippines	Pro Gaming Series (PGS)	(Philippines) Diamond Team	WGD
Philippines	Pro Gaming Series (PGS)	(Philippines) Mineski	MSK
Philippines	Pro Gaming Series (PGS)	(Philippines) Wargods	WG
Malaysia	LOL Championship Malaysia (LCM)	(Malaysia) KL Hunters	KLH
Malaysia	LOL Championship Malaysia (LCM)	(Malaysia) Team KTHXBAI	KTB
Singapore	Singapore Legends Series (SLS)	(Singapore) Team Fat Rabbit	TFR
Singapore	Singapore Legends Series (SLS)	(Singapore) Insidious Legends	IGL
Thailand	Thailand Pro League (TPL)	(Thailand) Bangkok Titans	BKT
Thailand	Thailand Pro League (TPL)	(Thailand) Team Infinite	IFIN
Indonesia	LOL Garuda Series (LGS)	(Indonesia) Jakarta Juggernauts	J2G

=== Results ===
==== Group stage ====
Group Stage #1
- Group A

#	Team	~	BKT	ASF	WG	WGD	W	L	±
1	(Thailand) Bangkok Titans	BKT	~	4−0	3−1	4−0	11	1	10
2	(Vietnam) ASUS FATE	ASF	0−4	~	4−0	4−0	8	4	4
3	(Philippines) Wargods	WG	1−3	0−4	~	4−0	5	7	−2
4	(Philippines) Diamond Team	WGD	0−4	0−4	0−4	~	0	12	−12

- Group B

#	Team	~	APU	SF5	MSK	IFIN	W	L	±
1	(Vietnam) Ultimate	UTM	~	2−2	4−0	4−0	10	2	8
2	(Vietnam) Saigon Fantastic Five	SF5	2−2	~	2−2	4−0	8	4	4
3	(Philippines) Mineski	NSK	0−4	2−2	~	4−0	6	6	0
4	(Thailand) Team Infinite	IFIN	0−4	0−4	0−4	~	0	12	−12

- Group C

#	Team	~	SAJ	HFL	TFR	J2G	W	L	±
1	(Vietnam) Saigon Jokers	SAJ	~	2−2	4−0	4−0	10	2	8
2	(Vietnam) Full Louis	HFL	2−2	~	2−2	4−0	8	4	4
3	(Singapore) Team Fat Rabbit	TFR	0−4	2−2	~	4−0	6	6	0
4	(Indonesia) Jakarta Juggernauts	J2G	0−4	0−4	0−4	~	0	12	−12

- Group D

#	Team	~	IGL	269	KLH	KTB	W	L	±
1	(Singapore) Insidious Legends	IGL	~	3−1	3−1	4−0	10	2	8
2	(Vietnam) 269 Gaming	269	1−3	~	3−1	4−0	8	4	4
3	(Malaysia) KL Hunters	KLH	1−3	1−3	~	3−1	5	7	−12
4	(Malaysia) Team KTHXBAI	KTB	0−4	0−4	1−3	~	1	11	−10

Group Stage #2
- Group A

#	Team	~	BKT	269	HFL	UTM	W	L	±
1	(Thailand) Bangkok Titans	BKT	~	2−2	3−1	3−1	8	4	4
2	(Vietnam) 269 Gaming	269	2−2	~	3−1	3−1	8	4	4
3	(Vietnam) Full Louis	HFL	1−3	1−3	~	3−1	5	7	−2
4	(Vietnam) Ultimate	UTM	1−3	1−3	1−3	~	3	9	−6

Tiebreaker Match (Thailand) Bangkok Titans 2−0 269 Gaming (Vietnam)

- Group B

#	Team	~	SF5	IGL	SAJ	ASF	W	L	±
1	(Vietnam) Saigon Fantastic Five	SF5	~	3−1	2−2	4−0	9	3	6
2	(Singapore) Insidious Legends	IGL	1−3	~	3−1	4−0	8	4	4
3	(Vietnam) Saigon Jokers	SAJ	2−2	1−3	~	3−1	6	6	0
4	(Vietnam) ASUS Fate	ASF	1−3	1−3	0−4	~	2	10	−8

=== Playoffs ===
Semi-finals
8 August 2015
(Vietnam) 269 Gaming	2
(Vietnam) Saigon Fantastic Five	3
8 August 2015
(Thailand) Bangkok Titans	3
(Indonesia) Insidious Legends	0

Finals
9 August 2015
(Vietnam) Saigon Fantastic Five	3
(Thailand) Bangkok Titans	0
3rd-place match
9 August 2015
(Indonesia) Insidious Legends	1
(Vietnam) 269 Gaming	3

=== Final standings ===
Place	Team	Prize money	Qualification
1st	(Vietnam) Saigon Fantastic Five	$20,000	IWCI 2015; SEA Finals
2nd	(Thailand) Bangkok Titans	$16,000	SEA Finals
3rd	(Vietnam) 269 Gaming	$12,000	
4th	(Singapore) Insidious Legends	$8,000	
5–8th	(Vietnam) Saigon Jokers	$5,000	
5–8th	(Vietnam) ASUS Fate	$5,000	
5–8th	(Vietnam) Full Louis	$5,000	
5–8th	(Vietnam) Ultimate	$5,000	
9-12th	(Philippines) Wargods	$3,500	
9-12th	(Philippines) Mineski	$3,500	
9-12th	(Singapore) Team Fat Rabbit	$3,500	
9-12th	(Malaysia) KL Hunters	$3,500	
13-16th	(Philippines) Diamond Team	$2,5000	
13-16th	(Thailand) Team Infinite	$2,5000	
13-16th	(Malaysia) Team KTHXBAI	$2,5000	
13-16th	(Indonesia) Jakarta Juggernauts	$2,5000	

== Summer ==
=== Format ===
- Group Stage #1

- 16 teams divided into 4 groups of 4 (8 Seeded, 8 Unseeded)
- Double Round Robin, Each match is Best of Two.

- 2:0 Winning team receives 3 points.
- 1:1 Both teams receive 1 point.

- Top 2 teams from each group advance to Group Stage #2.

- All Ties Broken by Head-to-Head Record before the tie-breaker.

- Leading team in 4 group at GPL Spring 2015 after week 4 will be qualified to participate Taipei IEM play-off

- Group Stage #2

- One group with 8 teams.
- Single Round Robin, Each match is Best of One.
- Top 4 teams advance to the Play-off.

- All ties broken by Head-to-Head Record before the tie-breaker.

- Play-off

- Single-elimination bracket of 4 teams, Group Stage #2 #1 Seed vs. Group Stage #2 #4 Seed and Group Stage #2 #2 Seed vs. Group Stage #2 #3 Seed.
- Matches are best of five
- Top 2 teams qualify to SEA Finals ^{1}

==== Qualifications ====
Countries	Slot	League
Vietnam	6	2015 VCS A Spring
Singapore/Malaysia	4	LCA Season 1
Philippines	3	PGS Spring
Thailand	2	TPL Spring
Indonesia	1	LGS Season 2

- ^1 Bangkok Titans has already qualified to SEA Finals. The spot will be replaced by the third place team.

=== Qualified teams ===
6 teams from 5 countries/areas

Counties	League	Team(s)	ID
Vietnam	VCSA	(Vietnam) Saigon Jokers	SAJ
Vietnam	VCSA	(Vietnam) Boba Marines	BM
Vietnam	VCSA	(Vietnam) Saigon Fantastic Five	SF5
Vietnam	VCSA	(Vietnam) Hanoi Fate	ASF
Vietnam	VCSA	(Vietnam) Full Louis	GFL
Vietnam	VCSA	(Vietnam) ZOTAC United	ZOT
Philippines	Pro Gaming Series (PGS)	(Philippines) Imperium Pro Team	IPT
Philippines	Pro Gaming Series (PGS)	(Philippines) Mineski	MSK
Philippines	Pro Gaming Series (PGS)	(Philippines) Wargods	WG
Malaysia	LOL Championship Malaysia (LCM)	(Malaysia) KL Hunters	KLH
Singapore	Singapore Legends Series (SLS)	(Singapore) Team Proioxis	PRS
Singapore	Singapore Legends Series (SLS)	(Singapore) Thirsty Chinchillas	TCH
Singapore	Singapore Legends Series (SLS)	(Singapore) Impunity Legends	IMP
Thailand	Thailand Pro League (TPL)	(Thailand) Bangkok Titans	BKT
Thailand	Thailand Pro League (TPL)	(Thailand) Go To Sleep	GTS
Indonesia	LOL Garuda Series (LGS)	(Indonesia) Jakarta Juggernauts	J2G

=== Results ===
==== Group stage ====
Group Stage #1
- Group A

#	Team	~	SAJ	ZOT	TCH	J2G	W	L	±
1	(Vietnam) Saigon Jokers	SAJ	~	2−0	2−0	2−0	6	0	6
2	(Vietnam) ZOTAC United	ZOT	0−2	~	2−0	1−1	3	3	0
3	(Singapore) Thirsty Chinchillas	TCH	0−2	1−1	~	2−0	3	3	0
4	(Indonesia) Jakarta Juggernauts	J2G	0−2	0−2	0−2	~	0	6	−6

2nd Tiebreaker match (Singapore) Thirsty Chinchillas 0−1 ZOTAC United (Vietnam)

- Group B

#	Team	~	ASF	SF5	IPT	WG	W	L	±
1	(Vietnam) Hanoi Fate	ASF	~	1−1	2−0	2−0	5	1	4
2	(Vietnam) Saigon Fantastic Five	SF5	1−1	~	1−1	1−1	3	3	0
3	(Philippines) Imperium Pro Team	IPT	1−1	1−1	~	0−2	2	4	−2
4	(Philippines) Wargods	WG	0−2	1−1	1−1	~	2	4	−2

3rd Tiebreaker match (Philippines) Wargods 0−1 Imperium Pro Team (Philippines)

- Group C

#	Team	~	GFL	KLH	IMP	PRS	W	L	±
1	(Vietnam) Full Louis	GFL	~	2−0	2−0	1−1	5	1	4
2	(Malaysia) Kuala Lumpur Hunters	KLH	1−1	~	2−0	0−2	3	3	0
3	(Singapore) Impunity Legends	IMP	0−2	0−2	~	2−0	2	4	−2
4	(Singapore) Team Proioxis	PRS	0−2	2−0	0−2	~	2	4	−2

- Group D

#	Team	~	BKT	BM	GTS	MSK	W	L	±
1	(Thailand) Bangkok Titans	BKT	~	2−0	2−0	2−0	6	0	0
2	(Vietnam) Boba Marines	269	0−2	~	2−0	2−0	4	2	2
3	(Thailand) Go To Sleep	GTS	0−2	0−2	~	1−1	1	5	−4
4	(Philippines) Mineski	MSK	0−2	0−2	1−1	~	1	5	−4

3rd Tiebreaker match (Thailand) Go To Sleep 1−0 Mineski (Philippines)

Group Stage #2

Double Round Robin. Top 4 teams advance to Knock-out stage.

#	Team	~	BM	GFL	BKT	SAJ	SF5	ASF	ZOT	KLH	W	L	±
1	(Vietnam) Boba Marines	BM	~	1−0	1−0	0−1	1−0	1−0	1−0	1−0	6	1	+5
2	(Vietnam) Full Louis	GFL	0−1	~	1−0	1−0	1−0	0−1	1−0	1−0	5	2	+3
3	(Thailand) Bangkok Titans	BKT	0−1	0−1	~	1−0	1−0	1−0	1−0	1−0	5	2	+3
4	(Vietnam) Saigon Jokers	SAJ	1−0	0−1	0−1	~	1−0	1−0	1−0	1−0	5	2	+3
5	(Vietnam) Saigon Fantastic Five	SF5	0−1	0−1	0−1	0−1	~	1−0	1−0	1−0	3	4	−1
6	(Vietnam) Hanoi Fate	ASF	0−1	1−0	0−1	0−1	0−1	~	1−0	1−0	3	4	−1
7	(Vietnam) ZOTAC United	ZOT	0−1	0−1	0−1	0−1	0−1	0−1	~	1−0	1	6	−5
8	(Malaysia) KL Hunters	KLH	0−1	0−1	0−1	0−1	0−1	0−1	0−1	~	0	7	−7

=== Playoffs ===
Semi-finals
8 August 2015
(Vietnam) Full Louis	2
(Thailand) Bangkok Titans	3
8 August 2015
(Vietnam) Saigon Jokers	3
(Vietnam) Boba Marines	0

Finals
9 August 2015
(Thailand) Bangkok Titans	3
(Vietnam) Saigon Jokers	0
3rd-place match
9 August 2015
(Vietnam) Boba Marines	2
(Vietnam) Full Louis	3

=== Final standings ===
Place	Team	Prize money	Qualification
1st	(Thailand) Bangkok Titans	$20,000	
2nd	(Vietnam) Saigon Jokers	$16,000	SEA Finals
3rd	(Vietnam) Full Louis	$12,000	SEA Finals
4th	(Vietnam) Boba Marines	$8,000	
5th	(Vietnam) Saigon Fantastic Five	$7,000	
6th	(Vietnam) Hanoi Fate	$6,000	
7th	(Vietnam) ZOTAC United	$5,000	
8th	(Malaysia) KL Hunters	$4,000	
9-12th	(Philippines) Imperium Pro Team	$3,000	
9-12th	(Thailand) Go To Sleep	$3,000	
9-12th	(Singapore) Thirsty Chinchillas	$3,000	
9-12th	(Singapore) Impunity Legends	$3,000	
13-16th	(Singapore) Team Proioxis	$2,5000	
13-16th	(Philippines) Wargods	$2,5000	
13-16th	(Philippines) Mineski	$2,5000	
13-16th	(Indonesia) Jakarta Juggernauts	$2,5000	

== Regional Finals ==
=== Format ===
- Top 2 teams from 2015 GPL Spring and 2015 GPL Summer.
- If additional teams are needed to reach 4 total teams, they will be added in order of 2015 GPL Summer Split finish.
- Single-elimination bracket.
- Each match is Best of Five.
- Winner qualifies for the 2015 International Wildcard Tournament.

=== Qualified teams ===
4 teams from 2 countries/areas

Counties	League	Team(s)	ID	Place
Vietnam	VCSA	(Vietnam) Saigon Jokers	SAJ	2nd 2015 GPL Summer
Vietnam	VCSA	(Vietnam) Saigon Fantastic Five	SF5	Winner 2015 GPL Spring
Vietnam	VCSA	(Vietnam) Full Louis	FL	3rd 2015 GPL Summer
Thailand	TPL	(Thailand) Bangkok Titans	BKT	Winner 2015 GPL Summer

=== Results ===
Semi-finals
15 August 2015
(Vietnam) Saigon Fantastic Five	1
(Vietnam) Saigon Jokers	3
15 August 2015
(Thailand) Bangkok Titans	3
(Vietnam) Full Louis	2

Finals
16 August 2015
(Thailand) Bangkok Titans	3
(Vietnam) Saigon Jokers	1
3rd place match
16 August 2015
(Vietnam) Saigon Fantastic Five	0
(Vietnam) Full Louis	3

=== Final standings ===
Place	Team	Qualification
1st	(Thailand) Bangkok Titans	2015 International Wildcard Tournament.
2nd	(Vietnam) Saigon Jokers	
3rd	(Vietnam) Full Louis	
4th	(Vietnam) Saigon Fantastic Five	
