= Vietnam Championship Series =

Vietnamese video game competition

- Game: League of Legends
- Founded: 2013
- No. of teams: 8
- Countries: Vietnam
- Most recent champion: GAM Esports (12th title)
- Most titles: GAM Esports (12 titles)
- Qualification: Promotion and relegation
- Promotion to: League of Legends Championship Pacific (from 2025)
- Relegation to: Vietnam Championship Series B
- International cups: Mid Season Invitational; World Championship
- Related competitions: Garena Premier League
- Website: vcs.vnggames.com

The Vietnam Championship Series (VCS) is a professional League of Legends esports league run by Riot Games and VNG Games, a subsidiary of VNG Corporation since 2022 after Garena stopped publishing League of Legends and its major competitions in Vietnam. From 2013 to 2017, the VCS was a tier below Garena Premier League (GPL). In 2018, the VCS broke away from the GPL and became a separate tier one league. In 2025, the VCS returned to being a tier two league, sitting below the newly created League of Legends Championship Pacific (LCP). The Vietnamese teams had the opportunity to participate directly in international events of League of Legends organized by Riot Games before then.

== History ==
=== 2012–2013 ===
Before changing the name to the Vietnam Championship Series tournament that once named the Glorious Arena. Over 4 seasons from mid 2012 to the end of 2013 the tournament saw the dominance of Saigon Jokers with 3 times of champion and once champion of Full Louis. By the end of 2013, it was changed to Vietnam Championship Series.

=== 2013–2015 ===
The first tournament was held in 2013 with the name Vietnam Championship Series without qualifying, the participating teams were invited by Vietnam Esports and the total prize value of the first tournament was VND 200,000,000. From the third season, the tournament starts with qualifiers and names are also changed to Vietnam Championship Series (VCS A) to distinguish them from the qualifying tournament of Vietnam Championship Series B (VCS B). In 2014, sponsored by Dell, the name of the prize was named Dell Championship Serie A (DCS A).

In 2015, the number of teams participating in VCS A was increased to 16 teams, playing in a round robin format with two turns (first and second round) scoring according to the Bo1 format. The team with the most points will be crowned champion. Saigon Fantastic Five has won the VCS A championship in spring 2015 and then the GPL spring 2015, becoming the first Vietnamese team to win the GPL.

=== 2016 ===
In 2016, VCS A made a big step when the tournament was officially part of the Riot Games tournament system, marking the official VCS A step up professionally. The organizing committee reduced the number of participating teams to 10, in return it will give 2 million VND / month to the coaches and athletes. The tournament format also changes accordingly: 10 rounds of 2 rounds count Bo1 points, 4 teams with the highest score will participate in play-offs to find champions. VCS A was also renamed Coca-Cola Championship Series (CCCS) under the sponsorship of Coca-Cola. By the summer of 2016, the Coca-Cola Championship Series was renamed the MountainDew Championship Series (MDCS) under the sponsorship of the Mountain Dew drinking water label.

=== 2017 ===
The number of teams participating in the competition continues to be reduced to 8, in return for the coach and athletes' salary increased to 3 million VND / month. The format of the tournament is also changed: 8 rounds of 2 rounds count Bo3 points, 4 teams with the highest score will participate in play-offs to find the champion.

=== 2018 ===
Riot Games directly participated in the tour operation, the tournament returned with the name Vietnam Championship Series, the total prize pool increased to 1 billion VND 200 million, the salary of coach and athletes increased to VND 4 million / month . In addition, VCS matches are held at GG Stadium – 6th Floor, Crescent Mall, District 7, Ho Chi Minh City built by Riot Games, instead of being organized online as before. Teams not based in Ho Chi Minh City will be supported by the organizers during the VCS Spring 2018. On 21 February 2018, VCS separated from GPL. This is a result based on the fact that in recent years VCS has always been the dominant force of the GPL. Especially at the two spring and summer events in 2017. Impressive competitions at MSI 2017 and World Championship 2017. Riot Games believes that this is a very appropriate time to get Vietnam away from the GPL to become a separate area. Changes in Vietnam's participatory international tournaments are as follows:

- Vietnam (VCS) will be grouped with Turkey (TCL) and CIS (LCL) at Rift Rivals.
- MSI: Will be expanded into a tournament for 14 teams.
- World Championship: Definitely get a boot round.

VCS Championship team Spring Spring 2018 will increase to 100 million VND, bringing the total value to 500 million VND will be separated from GPL's reward Spring 2018 (The expected prize that the Vietnamese champion team attends GPL Spring). However, this only applies to Spring, and from Summer onwards Vietnam will no longer relate to the GPL tournament.

=== 2024 – Match fixing scandal and final tier 1 season ===
On 15 March 2024, the Spring 2024 season of VCS was suspended due to "unexpected reasons that could affect the matches". By this point the season was in its final week, with 6 matches to be played when the season was suspended. On 18 March, the matches played on 14 March, one day before the suspension, were ruled null and void. All 8 teams in the VCS were put under investigation, with 32 players suspended indefinitely. One team, Rainbow Warriors, had all of their players suspended due to accusations of match fixing. The playoffs went ahead in April with the remaining Group stage games not played. On 3 June, before the Summer split, 29 of the 32 players were officially suspended. Rainbow Warriors were banned from the VCS and future Riot Games competitions, and their spot was revoked in addition.

On 11 June 2024 Riot announced "LoL Esports: Building Towards A Brighter Future", which overhauled the League of Legends Esports ecosystem. The VCS was to no longer be a league that qualified squads for the League of Legends World Championship, as instead an Asia-Pacific league would take its place. VCS would once again become a second tier, echoing the GPL days before 2018. The plans were as follows:

- New International Tournament (First Stand): First split with "Fearless Draft" drafting system
- Three seasons, with Regional Championship after third season
- League of Legends World Championship: Decrease to 17 teams
- MSI: Decrease to 10 teams
- Asia-Pacific League: 8 teams, 4 in partnership with Riot Games (Other 4 can relegate)

With 2024 Summer being the last season of VCS in Tier 1, GAM Esports won the title and, along with Vikings Esports, entered the 2024 League of Legends World Championship. GAM reached the Swiss Stage, while Vikings were eliminated in the play-ins. When the teams for the new league, the League of Legends Championship Pacific (LCP), were announced, GAM was announced as a partner team with Riot Games while Vikings Esports (as merit slot) and Team Whales joined as guests. In December, Team Whales formed a joint venture with Team Secret, renaming to Secret Whales for the inaugural LCP season.

=== 2025–Now – Back to Tier 2 ===
Out of the remaining teams in VCS' final Tier 1 season, only Team Flash chose to stay, with all other members opting to leave in one way or another. MGN Blue and CERBERUS Esports left the game altogether, while GAM Esports, Vikings Esports, and the newly formed Secret Whales, joined the LCP.

On 14 January 2025, the VCS announced its new format to accompany the transition back to Tier 2 league. The winning team of the new Final Round will join an LCP Promotion Tournament, competing for the chance to be promoted to the LCP for the following year.

However, before the Final Round, due to financial issues and unclear opportunities for promotion, Spring winner Hyper Vortex decided to disband. Spring runner-up Team Flash was chosen to replace Hyper Vortex for this Finals' slot, but decided to disband too. Final Round's winner Saigon Dino, could not have two main players due to visa issues in Taiwan, had to play with two Korean stand-in players and lost to MGN Viking Esports in LCP Promotion, then also disbanded.

In 2026 the VCS scaled down to just 6 teams competing for the Summer, Spring and Finals. With dominance by the newly formed MVK Academy (the academy team of MVK Esports following a rebrand by Vikings Esports) and the Tier-2 team Saigon Warriors. This is also the second year VCS is oragnized under the Vietnamese National Esports Championship System by the Vietnam Recreational and Electronic Sports Association (VIRESA).

On the 21 September 2026, it is announced that all current partners and guests teams in the LCP (GAM Esports, MVK Esports, Team Secret) will start competing in the VCS in 2027 before reaching the LCP as a regional bracket.

== Competition format ==
=== Road to VCS ===
Road to VCS is the promotion tournament series for Vietnam Championship Series which allows amateur teams to qualify for the VCS. Before each split, three teams (Four for Spring 2025) qualify from this mechanism, which features open qualifiers both online and LAN.

=== Swiss stage ===
This period will have the participation of 8 teams, playing a modified Swiss-system tournament setup. The strongest teams (Those who win two series) advance to the Round Knockout, while the two worst teams (Those who lost three series) have to requalify for the next split via Road to VCS. Each game is played according to the ban and Select 5vs5 on the map Summoner's Rift.

=== Playoffs ===
6 teams will compete against each other in a double elimination mode to find the champion of the split: the 3rd, 4th, 5th and 6th teams will fight each other in the first matches of winners brackets, the winning team will go on to meet the 1st and 2nd teams in the second matches of winners brackets, etc. The winner of the Grand Finals in both Spring and Summer is the top team in VCS for the split, while the worst team in this round has to requalify via Road to VCS. Matches of this stage will take place in the form of Best of 3 (3 games maximum) for the first rounds and Best of 5 (5 games maximum) for the final rounds.

=== Finals ===
The champions of Spring and top 3 teams of Summer qualify for Finals, an in-person event serving as end of season championship for Vietnam Championship Series. The Summer champions chooses their opponent for first semi-final match, while the remaining teams play in second semi-final match. The winners of these semi-finals compete in the Grand Final, with the winner becoming VCS Champion and earning League of Legends Championship Pacific (LCP) Promotion Tournament spot. The matches of Final Round take place as Best of 5 (5 games maximum).

== Past seasons ==
Year	Split	Duration	1st	2nd	3rd
Tier 2 era (2013–2017)
2013	Winter	11 February 2013 – 17 December 2013	XGame	Hanoi Dragons	Beautiful Life Gaming
2014	Spring	22 February 2014 – 13 April 2014	Team Ozone Cutie Monsters	Hanoi Dragons	Hanoi Fate
2014	Summer	14 June 2014 – 24 September 2014	Hanoi Fate	HoL Elements	Hanoi Phoenix
2015	Spring	15 November 2014 – 4 June 2015	Saigon Fantastic Five	Saigon Jokers	Boba Marines
2015	Summer	17 May 2015 – 24 August 2015	Boba Marines	Full Louis	Saigon Jokers
2016	Spring	15 January 2016 – 3 June 2016	Saigon Jokers	Full Louis	269 Gaming; Boba Marines
2016	Summer	20 May 2016 – 18 July 2016	Saigon Jokers	Saigon Mongaming	An Phát Ultimate; Boba Marines
2017	Spring	8 February 2017 – 2 April 2017	GIGABYTE Marines	Young Generation	UTM Esports
2017	Summer	7 June 2017 – 13 August 2017	GIGABYTE Marines	Young Generation	ROG Friends
Tier 1 era (2018–2024)
2018	Spring	18 January 2018 – 4 July 2018	EVOS Esports	GIGABYTE Marines	UTM Esports
2018	Summer	21 June 2018 – 22 September 2018	Phong Vũ Buffalo	Adonis Esports	Friends Forever
2019	Spring	17 January 2019 – 13 April 2019	Phong Vũ Buffalo	EVOS Esports	Sky Gaming
2019	Summer	20 June 2019 – 15 September 2019	GAM Esports	Lowkey Esports	Team Flash
2020	Spring	31 January 2020 – 18 April 2020	Team Flash	GAM Esports	EVOS Esports
2020	Summer	19 June 2020 – 5 September 2020	Team Flash	GAM Esports	EVOS Esports
2021	Spring	22 January 2021 – 18 April 2021	GAM Esports	Saigon Buffalo	Team Secret
2021	Summer	Cancelled due to COVID-19 pandemic in Vietnam			
2021	Winter	16 November 2021 – 26 December 2021	CERBERUS Esports	GAM Esports	Burst The Sky Esports
2022	Spring	11 February 2022 – 24 April 2022	GAM Esports	Saigon Buffalo	Team Secret
2022	Summer	7 June 2022 – 4 September 2022	GAM Esports	Saigon Buffalo	Team Secret
2023	Spring	24 February 2023 – 23 April 2023	GAM Esports	SBTC Esports	CERBERUS Esports
2023	Summer	23 June 2023 – 9 September 2023	GAM Esports	Team Whales	Team Secret
2024	Spring	20 January 2024 – 7 April 2024	GAM Esports	Vikings Esports	Team Secret
2024	Summer	21 June 2024 – 18 August 2024	GAM Esports	Vikings Esports	Team Whales
Tier 2 era (2025 – present)
2025	Spring	28 February 2025 – 30 March 2025	Hyper Vortex	Team Flash	Saigon Secret
2025	Summer	21 May 2025 – 22 June 2025	Saigon Dino	MVK Academy	Team Flash
2025	Finals	29 August 2024 – 31 August 2025	Saigon Dino	SN CyberCore	Never Give Up
2026	Spring	28 February 2026 - 29 March 2026	MVK Academy	Saigon Warriors	Saigon Dino
2026	Summer	13 May 2026 - 20 June 2026	Saigon Warriors	Saigon Dino	Zen Esport
2026	Finals	11 September 2026 - 11 October 2026	MVK Academy	Saigon Warriors	Cybercore Esports

== Statistics ==
=== Top-performing teams ===
Team(s)	1st	2nd	3rd
GAM Esports	11	3	3
Saigon Buffalo	2	5	0
Saigon Jokers	2	1	1
Team Flash	2	1	2
Saigon Dino	2	1	1
MVK Academy	2	1	0
EVOS Esports	1	1	2
Saigon Warriors	1	2	0
Hanoi Fate	1	0	1
Cerberus Esports	1	0	0
Saigon Fantastic Five	1	0	0
XGame	1	0	0
Team Ozone Cutie Monsters	1	0	0
Full Louis	0	2	0
Team Whales	0	2	0
Vikings Esports	0	2	0
Team Secret	0	0	5

== Individual awards ==
=== Season MVP Standings ===
Year	Split	Player	Team	Time/Points
2017	Spring	Đỗ "Levi" Duy Khánh	GIGABYTE Marines	400
2017	Summer			
2018	Spring	Nguyễn "YiJin" Lê Hải Đăng	EVOS Esports	900
2018	Summer	Phạm "Zeros" Minh Lộc	Phong Vũ Buffalo	10
2019	Spring	Phạm "Zeros" Minh Lộc	Phong Vũ Buffalo	1100
2019	Summer	Đỗ "Levi" Duy Khánh; Nguyễn " YiJin " Lê Hải Đăng	GAM Esports; Team Flash	800
2020	Spring	Lê "Dia1" Phú Quý	GAM Esports	1100
2020	Summer	Lê "Dia1" Phú Quý	GAM Esports	1000
2021	Spring	Đỗ "Levi" Duy Khánh	GAM Esports	1000
2021	Winter	Lê Lưu "Killerqueen" Bách Đạt	Luxury Esports	11
2022	Spring	Trần "BeanJ" Văn Chính	Saigon Buffalo	1000
