= 2013 GPL season =

Asian esports league season

- League: Garena Premier League
- Sport: League of Legends
- Duration: 1 April – 21 April (Spring); 10 May – 18 August (Summer)
- Teams: 8

Spring Split
- Champions: (Taiwan) Taipei Assassins
- Runners-up: Singapore Sentinels

Summer Split
- Champions: (Taiwan) ahq eSports Club
- Runners-up: Singapore Sentinels

GPL seasons
- ← 2012 2014 →

The 2013 GPL season was the second edition of the Garena Premier League, a Riot Games-organised tournament for League of Legends

== Spring ==
=== Format ===
- Regular Season

- 14 week season
- Round robin matches
- Each team plays all of the other teams four times
- Each match is best of one
- In case of a two way tie, head-to-head record resolves the tie.
- First team receives a spot for the championship

=== Participants ===
8 teams from 6 countries/areas

Counties	Team(s)	ID
Vietnam	(Vietnam) Saigon Jokers	SAJ
Vietnam	(Vietnam) Saigon Fantastic Five	SF5
Taiwan	(Taiwan) Taipei Assassins	TPA
Taiwan	(Taiwan) ahq eSports Club	ahq
Malaysia	(Malaysia) KL Hunters	KLH
Singapore	Singapore Sentinels	SGS
Thailand	(Thailand) Bangkok Titans	BKT
Philippines	(Philippines) Manila Eagles	ME

=== Results ===
==== Group stage ====
#	Team	~	TPA	SGS	ahq	SAJ	KLH	SF5	ME	BKT	W	L	±
1	(Taiwan) Taipei Assassins	TPA	~	3−1	4−0	4−0	4−0	4−0	4−0	4−0	27	1	+26
2	Singapore Sentinels	SGS	1−3	~	4−0	2−2	4−0	3−1	4−0	4−0	22	6	+16
3	(Taiwan) ahq eSports Club	ahq	0−4	0−4	~	4−0	4−0	4−0	4−0	4−0	20	8	+12
4	(Vietnam) Saigon Joker	SAJ	0−4	2−2	0−4	~	3−1	3−1	4−0	4−0	16	12	+4
5	(Malaysia) KL Hunters	KLH	0−4	0−4	0−4	1−3	~	3−1	4−0	2−2	10	18	−8
6	(Vietnam) Saigon Fantatic Five	SF5	0−4	1−3	0−4	1−3	1−3	~	2−2	3−1	8	20	−12
7	(Philippines) Manila Eagles	ME	0−4	0−4	0−4	0−4	0−4	2−2	~	3−1	5	23	−18
8	(Thailand) Bangkok Titans	BKT	0−4	0−4	0−4	0−4	2−2	1−3	1−3	~	4	24	−20

=== Final standings ===
Place	Team	Prize money
1st	(Taiwan) Taipei Assassins	$50,000
2nd	Singapore Sentinels	$25,000
3rd	(Taiwan) ahq eSports Club	$10,000
4th	(Vietnam) Saigon Jokers	$5,000
5th	(Malaysia) KL Hunters	$2,500
6th	(Vietnam) Saigon Fantatc Five	$2,500
7th	(Philippines) Manila Eagles	$2,500
8th	(Thailand) Bangkok Titans	$2,500

== Summer ==
=== Format ===
- Regular Season

- 14 week season
- Round robin matches
- Each team plays all of the other teams four times
- Each match is best of one
- Regular season champion receives a spot for the championship

=== Participants ===
8 teams from 6 countries/areas

Counties	Team(s)	ID
Vietnam	(Vietnam) Saigon Jokers	SAJ
Vietnam	(Vietnam) Saigon Fantastic Five	SF5
Taiwan	(Taiwan) Taipei Assassins	TPA
Taiwan	(Taiwan) ahq eSports Club	ahq
Malaysia	(Malaysia) KL Hunters	KLH
Singapore	Singapore Sentinels	SGS
Thailand	(Thailand) Bangkok Titans	BKT
Philippines	(Philippines) Manila Eagles	ME

=== Results ===
==== Group stage ====
- Each match is best of one

#	Team	~	ahq	SGS	TPA	SAJ	KLH	BKT	ME	SF5	W	L	±
1	(Taiwan) ahq eSports Club	ahq	~	3−1	3−1	4−0	4−0	3−1	3−1	4−0	24	4	+20
2	Singapore Sentinels	SGS	1−3	~	4−0	3−1	4−0	3−1	4−0	4−0	23	5	+18
3	(Taiwan) Taipei Assassins	TPA	1−3	0−4	~	3−1	3−1	4−0	4−0	4−0	19	9	+10
4	(Vietnam) Saigon Joker	SAJ	0−4	1−3	1−3	~	1−3	2−2	4−0	4−0	13	15	−2
5	(Malaysia) KL Hunters	KLH	0−4	0−4	1−3	3−1	~	4−0	1−3	3−1	12	16	−4
6	(Thailand) Bangkok Titans	BKT	1−3	1−3	0−4	2−2	0−4	~	2−2	3−1	9	19	−10
7	(Philippines) Manila Eagles	ME	1−3	0−4	0−4	0−4	3−1	1−3	~	3−1	8	20	−12
8	(Vietnam) Saigon Fantatic Five	SF5	0−4	0−4	0−4	0−4	1−3	2−2	1−3	~	4	24	−20

=== Final standings ===
Place	Team	Prize money
1st	(Taiwan) ahq eSports Club	$50,000
2nd	Singapore Sentinels	$25,000
3rd	(Taiwan) Taipei Assassins	$10,000
4th	(Vietnam) Saigon Jokers	$5,000
5th	(Malaysia) KL Hunters	$2,500
6th	(Thailand) Bangkok Titans	$2,500
7th	(Philippines) Manila Eagles	$2,500
8th	(Vietnam) Saigon Fantatc Five	$2,500
