= 2017 GPL season =

Ninth edition of the Garena Premier League

- League: Garena Premier League
- Sport: League of Legends
- Duration: 12 April – 16 April (Spring); 21 August – 27 August (Summer)
- Teams: 6 (Spring); 7 (Summer)

Spring Split
- Champions: (Vietnam) GIGABYTE Marines
- Runners-up: (Thailand) Ascension Gaming

Summer Split
- Champions: (Vietnam) GIGABYTE Marines
- Runners-up: (Vietnam) Young Generation

GPL seasons
- ← 2016 2018 →

The 2017 GPL season was the sixth edition of the Garena Premier League, a Riot Games-organised tournament for League of Legends, the multiplayer online battle arena video game. It is a fully professional League of Legends league over all of the Southeast Asia region, with 6 teams from 6 countries/areas to determine which team is the best in the region, and is the qualification tournament for Southeast Asian teams to play at the MSI 2017, the Rift Rivals 2017, and the 2017 League of Legends World Championship.

== Spring ==
=== Format ===
- Six teams participate

- Teams from PGS, TLC MY, TLC SG, and LGS start in the Group Stage
- Teams from VCS and TLCS receive a bye to the Playoffs

- Group Stage

- Double round robin
- Matches are best of one
- Top two teams advance to Playoffs

- Playoffs

- Single elimination bracket
- 1st place team of Group Stage faces TLCS team, 2nd place team faces VCS team.
- Matches are best of five
- Winner qualifies for MSI 2017
- Top 3 teams qualify for Rift Rivals 2017 (3rd place is granted to the semifinals loser with the higher Group Stage finish)

=== Participants ===
6 teams from 6 countries/areas

| Countries | Slot | League | Team | ID |
|---|---|---|---|---|
| Vietnam | 1 | VCS | (Vietnam) GIGABYTE Marines | GAM |
| Singapore | 1 | TLC SG | (Singapore) Team Rigel | RG |
| Philippines | 1 | PGS | (Philippines) Mineski | MSK |
| Thailand | 1 | TPL | (Thailand) Ascension Gaming | ASC |
| Indonesia | 1 | LGS | (Indonesia) Fortius | FTS |
| Malaysia | 1 | TPL MY | (Malaysia) KL Hunters | KLH |

=== Results ===
==== Group stage ====
Double Round Robin. Top 4 teams advance to Bracket Stage.

| # | Team | ~ | MSK | KLH | FTS | RG | W | L | ± |
|---|---|---|---|---|---|---|---|---|---|
| 1 | (Philippines) Mineski | MSK | ~ | 2−0 | 1−1 | 1−1 | 4 | 2 | +2 |
| 2 | (Malaysia) KL Hunters | KLH | 0−2 | ~ | 2−0 | 2−0 | 4 | 2 | +2 |
| 3 | (Indonesia) Fortius | FTS | 1−1 | 0−2 | ~ | 1−1 | 2 | 4 | −2 |
| 4 | (Singapore) Team Rigel | RG | 1−1 | 0−2 | 1−1 | ~ | 2 | 4 | −2 |

==== Bracket Stage ====
- 1st place team of Group Stage chooses between 3rd and 4th place to be their semifinal opponent
- Matches are best of five.

Semi-finals
April 14
(Thailand) Ascension Gaming | 3
(Philippines) Mineski | 2
April 14
(Vietnam) GIGABYTE Marines | 3
(Malaysia) KL Hunter | 2

Final
April 16
(Thailand) Ascension Gaming | 0
(Vietnam) GIGABYTE Marines | 3

=== Final standings ===
| Place | Team | Qualification |
| 1st | (Vietnam) GIGABYTE Marines | MSI 2017; Rift Rivals 2017 |
| 2nd | (Thailand) Ascension Gaming | Rift Rivals 2017 |
| 3rd | (Philippines) Mineski | Rift Rivals 2017 |
| 4th | (Malaysia) KL Hunter | |
| 5th | (Indonesia) Fortius | |
| 6th | (Singapore) Team Rigel | |

== Summer ==
=== Format ===
- Seven teams participate

- Winners of PGS, TLC MY, SLS, LGS, and the 2nd place team of VCS start in the Group Stage
- Winners of VCS and TLCS receive a bye to the Playoffs

- Group Stage

- Double round robin
- Matches are best of one
- Top two teams advance to Playoffs

- Playoffs

- Double elimination bracket
- 1st place team of Group Stage faces TLCS team, 2nd place team faces VCS #1 team.
- Matches are best of five

- Winner qualifies for the 2017 Season World Championship Main Event
- Runner-up qualifies for the 2017 Season World Championship Play-In

=== Participants ===
7 teams from 6 countries/areas

| Countries | Slot | League | Team | ID |
|---|---|---|---|---|
| Vietnam | 1 | VCS | (Vietnam) GIGABYTE Marines | GAM |
| Vietnam | 2 | VCS | (Vietnam) Young Generation | YG |
| Singapore | 1 | SLS | (Singapore) Resurgence | RSG |
| Philippines | 1 | PGS | (Philippines) Team Manila Eagles | TME |
| Thailand | 1 | TLCS | (Thailand) Ascension Gaming | ASC |
| Indonesia | 1 | LGS | (Indonesia) Headhunters | H2 |
| Malaysia | 1 | TLC MY | (Malaysia) KL Hunters | KLH |

=== Results ===
==== Group stage ====
Double Round Robin. Top 5 teams advance to Bracket Stage.

| # | Team | ~ | YG | TME | RSG | KLH | H2 | W | L | ± |
|---|---|---|---|---|---|---|---|---|---|---|
| 1 | (Vietnam) Young Generation | YG | ~ | 2−0 | 2−0 | 1−1 | 2−0 | 7 | 1 | +6 |
| 2 | (Philippines) Team Manila Eagles | TME | 0−2 | ~ | 2−0 | 2−0 | 1−1 | 5 | 3 | +2 |
| 3 | (Singapore) Resurgence | RSG | 0−2 | 0−2 | ~ | 2−0 | 2−0 | 4 | 4 | 0 |
| 4 | (Malaysia) KL Hunters | RG | 1−1 | 0−2 | 0−2 | ~ | 2−0 | 3 | 5 | −2 |
| 5 | (Indonesia) Headhunters | H2 | 0−2 | 1−1 | 0−2 | 0−2 | ~ | 1 | 7 | −6 |

==== Bracket Stage ====
- Matches are best of five.

Semi-finals
August 25
(Vietnam) GIGABYTE Marines | 3
(Philippines) Team Manila Eagles | 0
August 25
(Thailand) Ascension Gaming | 3
(Vietnam) Young Generation | 2

Final
August 26
(Thailand) Ascension Gaming | 0
(Vietnam) GIGABYTE Marines | 3

Semi-finals
August 26
(Vietnam) Young Generation | 3
(Philippines) Team Manila Eagles | 0
August 27
(Thailand) Ascension Gaming | 2
(Vietnam) Young Generation | 3

Final

=== Final standings ===
| Place | Team | Qualification |
| 1st | (Vietnam) GIGABYTE Marines | 2017 Season World Championship Main Event |
| 2nd | (Vietnam) Young Generation | 2017 Season World Championship Play-In |
| 3rd | (Thailand) Ascension Gaming | |
| 4th | (Philippines) Team Manila Eagles | |
| 5th | (Singapore) Resurgence | |
| 6th | (Malaysia) KL Hunters | |
| 7th | (Indonesia) Headhunters | |
