= Toyz =

Hong Kong esports personality (born 1992)

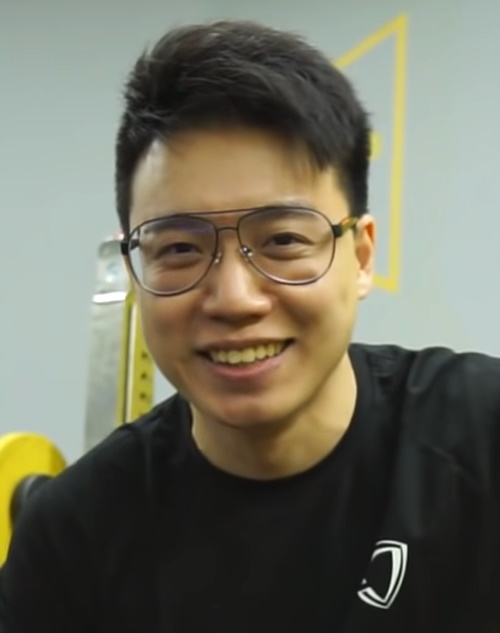
- Lau in 2020
- Born: Lau Wai-kin; 9 June 1992 (age 34); Sha Tin, Hong Kong

YouTube information
- Channels: Toyz; Toyz 實況精華
- Years active: 2014–present
- Subscribers: 837,000 (Toyz); 339,000 (Toyz 實況精華)
- Views: 248 million (Toyz); 116 million (Toyz 實況精華)

Esports career information
- Game: League of Legends
- Playing career: 2011–2013, 2014–2015
- Role: Mid
- Coaching career: 2014, 2017–2019

Team history

As player:
- 2011–2012: CrossGaming
- 2012–2013: Taipei Assassins
- 2014–2015: Hong Kong Esports

As coach:
- 2014: Fnatic
- 2017–2019: G-Rex

Career highlights and awards
- World champion (2012)

Chinese name
- Traditional Chinese: 劉偉健
- Simplified Chinese: 刘伟健
Transcriptions
Standard Mandarin
- Hanyu Pinyin: Liú Wěijiàn
Yue: Cantonese
- Yale Romanization: Làuh Wáih-gihn
- Jyutping: Lau^{4} Wai^{5}-gin^{6}
- Criminal information
- Status: Incarcerated on 16 May 2024; scheduled for release on 16 July 2028
- Criminal charge: Possession of Category Two narcotics with intention to sell
- Penalty: 4 years and 2 months in prison

Details
- Imprisoned at: Taichung Prison, Nantun District, Taichung
- Last updated: 17 October 2026

Kurtis Lau Wai-kin (Chinese: 劉偉健; born 9 June 1992), better known as Toyz, is a Hong Kong esports personality and YouTuber. He is a former professional League of Legends player, best known for winning the Season 2 World Championship as the mid laner for Taipei Assassins. Following his retirement in late 2015, he transitioned to several coaching and managerial roles for esports teams in Taiwan before switching his focus to his YouTube channel.

Lau was arrested by Taiwanese police in late 2021, on suspicion of trafficking marijuana. The following year, he pled guilty to one charge of possessing Category Two narcotics with the intention to sell and was sentenced to 4 years and 2 months in prison. He unsuccessfully appealed the sentence, and began serving his sentence in 2024. He was released on parole and deported back to Hong Kong in 2026.

== Career ==
After starting his competitive career by playing for the amateur team CrossGaming in 2011, Lau was recruited by Taipei Assassins in April 2012, with whom he went on to win the Season 2 World Championship. Although he was successful while playing for Taipei Assassins, in June 2013 he was forced to retire from professional play because of carpal tunnel syndrome.

In 2014, he coached for the European team Fnatic during their run in the 2014 World Championship, which ended in the group stage. However, Lau returned to professional play in 2015, forming the Hong Kong Esports team together with former Taipei Assassins teammate Wang "Stanley" June-tsan. Lau left Hong Kong Esports on 14 October 2015, after making a lengthy post on his Facebook account accusing the team's CEO, Derek Cheung, of match fixing on September.

On 12 September 2016, Lau founded Raise Gaming to compete in the Elite Challenger Series (ECS), the secondary league of the League of Legends Master Series (LMS), with the goal of qualifying for the LMS. Under Lau's coaching the team placed first in the 2017 ECS Spring regular season and second in playoffs. The team qualified for the LMS after defeating Team Yetti in the promotion tournament. When the team rebranded to G-Rex on 15 September 2017, Lau stayed with the team as a coach, before becoming the organisation's Director of Esports in mid-2018. He left G-Rex at the end of 2019.

=== Notable tournament results ===
Date	Event	Placing	Final game		
2012-04-30	NVIDIA Game Festival 2012	(silver) 2nd	Taipei Assassins	1–2	World Elite
2012-05-29	Go4LoL Pro Asia Season 1	(gold) 1st	Taipei Assassins	2–0	World Elite
2012-06-17	StarsWar 7	(gold) 1st	Taipei Assassins	2–1	World Elite
2012-07-15	IGN Pro League Season 5 Taiwanese Qualifiers	(gold) 1st	Taipei Assassins	2–0	Corsair
2012-09-01	Season Two Taiwanese Regional Finals	(gold) 1st	Taipei Assassins	2–0	Corsair
2012-10-13	Season 2 World Championship	(gold) 1st	Taipei Assassins	3–1	Azubu Frost
2012-11-17	2012 Garena Premier League Season 1	(gold) 1st	Taipei Assassins	3–1	Singapore Sentinels
2012-12-02	IGN Pro League Season 5	(bronze) 3rd	Taipei Assassins	0–2	Fnatic
2013-04-21	2013 Garena Premier League Spring	(gold) 1st	Taipei Assassins	No playoffs	
2013-05-19	NVIDIA Game Festival 2013	(bronze) 3rd	Taipei Assassins	2–1	OMG
2013-05-26	All-Star Shanghai 2013 – Mid Lane Skill Competition	(gold) 1st	Toyz	1–0	Misaya
2013-08-29	2013 Garena Premier League Championship	(silver) 2nd	Taipei Assassins	0–3	ahq e-Sports Club
2015-07-26	2015 League of Legends Master Series Summer	(silver) 2nd	Hong Kong Esports	0–3	ahq e-Sports Club

== Arrest ==
Taiwanese police in Taichung arrested Lau on suspicion of trafficking marijuana on 29 September 2021. He subsequently pled guilty to one charge of possessing Category Two narcotics with the intention to sell on 16 June 2022 and was sentenced to 4 years and 2 months in prison. He appealed his sentence in 2023, but his appeal was denied. He began serving his sentence on 16 May 2024.

He was granted parole on 20 October 2026 and subsequently released and immediately deported back to Hong Kong on 3 November.
