= Garena Premier League =

Esports league in Southeast Asia (2012–2018)

- Sport: League of Legends
- First season: 2012
- Replaced by: LST
- Owner: Garena
- No. of teams: 5
- Countries: Southeast Asia 5 countries: Indonesia; Malaysia; Philippines; Singapore; Thailand; (Included Taiwan, Hong Kong, Macau before 2015 and Vietnam before 2018)
- Venue: Various
- Most recent champion: (Thailand) Ascension Gaming
- Most titles: (Taiwan) Taipei Assassins
- Qualification: 5 minor leagues: LoL Garuda Series; LoL Champion Malaysia; Pro Gaming Series; Singapore Legends Series; Thailand Pro League
- Broadcasters: Garena Live, YouTube
- Sponsors: Riot Games, Garena
- Level on pyramid: Tier 1
- International cups: Mid Season Invitational; Rift Rivals; World Championship
- Related competitions: LMS; VCS; PCS

The Garena Premier League (GPL) was a professional League of Legends esports league with teams in Southeast Asia (included teams from Taiwan, Hong Kong, Macau before 2015 and Vietnam before 2018). It was founded in 2012. The opening event took place on May 5 with Riot's CEO Brandon Beck, VP of Gaming Dustin Beck, Taiwanese game designer Jeff Lin, and Nikasaur attending personally. It is the first regional professional esports competition of League of Legends in the world. In last season - 2018 Spring - the league consists of 5 teams who are the champions of 5 national leagues in Southeast Asia. The top four teams of group stage are advanced to the playoff, which are held in a best-of-5 single elimination system.

In late 2014, Riot and Garena split teams from Taiwan, Macau, and Hong Kong into their own league, the LMS, which began play in Spring 2015. Following the changes, the GPL no longer sent teams directly to the League of Legends World Championship group stage. The GPL became part of the International Wildcard tournament, along with CBLoL (Brazil), OPL (Oceania), LCL (CIS), LJL (Japan), TCL (Turkey), LLN (Latin America North) and CLS (Latin America South), and would compete to represent the Wildcard regions in the play in stages at the Mid-Season Invitational and World Championship.

In 2018, the Vietnam Championship Series (VCS) separated from the GPL. The winner of VCS will qualify for Mid-Season Invitational and World Championship without taking part in the GPL.

The 2018 GPL Spring Split was the last GPL tournament. Afterwards, the GPL was replaced by the League of Legends SEA Tour (LST) with a new format. The winner of the LST will represent Southeast Asia to qualify for Play-in Stage of Mid-Season Invitational and World Championship, begin from World Championship 2018.

== Participants of GPL ==
=== Last season (2018 Spring split) ===
Region	League
Indonesia	LOL Garuda Series (LGS)
Malaysia	LOL Championship Malaysia (LCM)
Philippines	Pro Gaming Series (PGS)
Singapore	Singapore Legends Series (SLS)
Thailand	Thailand Pro League (TPL)

In mid-2018, the GPL was replaced with the LST, and the leagues of each country were replaced by "LST Qualifiers"

=== Former ===
Region	Championship League	Note
Taiwan; Hong Kong; Macau	League of Legends Nova League (LNL)	Separated in 2015, became a Major Region (guaranteed two slots in the World Championship, three slots from 2017 onwards). The LNL was replaced by the League of Legends Master Series (LMS).
Vietnam	Vietnam Championship Series (VCS)	Separated in 2018, became a Wildcard Region (guaranteed one slot for MSI and the World Championship). VCS became a Tier 1 league like the GPL.

== Results ==
Year	Split	Winner	Runner-Up
2012	Season 1	(Taiwan) Taipei Assassins	Singapore Sentinels
2013	Spring	(Taiwan) Taipei Assassins	Singapore Sentinels
2013	Summer	(Taiwan) ahq e-Sports Club	Singapore Sentinels
2014	Winter	(Taiwan) Taipei Assassins	(Taiwan) Taipei Snipers
2014	Spring	(Taiwan) Taipei Assassins	(Taiwan) ahq e-Sports Club
2014	Summer	(Taiwan) Taipei Assassins	(Taiwan) ahq e-Sports Club
After Taiwan-Hong Kong-Macau separated
2015	Spring	(Vietnam) Saigon Fantastic Five	(Thailand) Bangkok Titans
2015	Summer	(Thailand) Bangkok Titans	(Vietnam) Saigon Jokers
2016	Spring	(Vietnam) Saigon Jokers	(Thailand) Bangkok Titans
2016	Summer	(Vietnam) Saigon Jokers	(Thailand) Bangkok Titans
2017	Spring	(Vietnam) GIGABYTE Marines	(Thailand) Ascension Gaming
2017	Summer	(Vietnam) GIGABYTE Marines	(Vietnam) Young Generation
After Vietnam separated
2018	Spring	(Thailand) Ascension Gaming	(Malaysia) Kuala Lumpur Hunters

== Record ==
=== Top-performing ===
Team	Winner	Runner-Up
(Taiwan) Taipei Assassins	5	
(Taiwan) ahq e-Sports Club	1	
Singapore Sentinels		3
(Taiwan) Taipei Snipers		1
After Taiwan-Hong Kong-Macau separated
(Vietnam) Saigon Jokers	2	1
(Vietnam) GIGABYTE Marines	2	
(Thailand) Bangkok Titans	1	3
(Vietnam) Saigon Fantastic Five	1	
(Vietnam) Young Generation		1
(Thailand) Ascension Gaming		1
After Vietnam separated
(Thailand) Ascension Gaming	1	
(Malaysia) Kuala Lumpur Hunters		1
