= 2017 Vietnam Championship Series A Summer Season =

League of Legends League

2017 VCS A Summer
- 2017

Tournament information
- Sport: League of Legends
- Dates: 7 June–13 August
- Administrator: Garena Vietnam
- Host: Vietnam
- Teams: 8

Final positions
- Champions: GIGABYTE Marines
- Runner-up: Young Generation

The 2017 Vietnam Championship Series A Summer Season was the second split of the fifth season of Vietnam's fully professional League of Legends league. Eight teams competed in a round robin group stage, with the top four teams continuing to offline playoffs.

== Format ==
- 8 teams participate

- 6 teams from 2017 VCS A Spring
- 1 teams from Summer Promotion
- 1 teams from 2017 VCS B Season 1

- Group Stage

- 7 weeks, League play
- Double Round Robin
- Each match is best of three
- Advancement:

- Top 4 teams advance to the playoffs.
- Bottom 2 teams drop to 2018 Spring Promotion.
- Each team has 10 players who can be registered in the team's line-up at the same time.

- Playoffs

- King of the Hill Bracket
- All matches are best of five
- 1st and 2nd place teams will qualify for 2017 GPL Summer.

== Participants ==
Team(s)	ID
(Vietnam) Cherry Esports	CR
(Vietnam) e.Hub United	EHU
(Vietnam) LG Red (Note: LG Red acquires the roster and spot of e.Hub United 2.)	LGR
(Vietnam) Friends Forever Gaming	FFQ
(Vietnam) GIGABYTE Marines	GAM
(Vietnam) Fighters Gaming (Note: Fighters Gaming acquires the roster and spot of Next Gen Esports.)	FIG
(Vietnam) Young Generation	YG
(Vietnam) Ultimate	UTM

=== Rosters ===
Teams	Players					
Teams	Top	Jungle	Mid	ADC	Support	Coach
Cherry Esports	(Vietnam) Slay	(Vietnam) Tsu (Vietnam) Garfield (Vietnam) Ticker	(Vietnam) Warzone	(Vietnam) Clear	(Vietnam) Kidz (Vietnam) Habinger	
e.Hub United	(Vietnam) Taurus (Vietnam) Keiko	(Vietnam) Xuhao	(Vietnam) Victory (Vietnam) Empty	(Vietnam) Zin	(Vietnam) CombatLao	(Vietnam) NIXWATER
Boba Marines	(Vietnam) Archie (Vietnam) Nevan	(Vietnam) Levi	(Vietnam) Optimus	(Vietnam) Noway	(Vietnam) Sya	(Vietnam) Tinikun
Friends Forever	(Vietnam) KingJ	(Vietnam) Haeven	(Vietnam) QTV (Vietnam) PotM	(Vietnam) Celebrity	(Vietnam) Sergh (Vietnam) BaRoiBeo (Vietnam) ChiChi	(Vietnam) Junie
Fighters Gaming	(Vietnam) Chocobo	(Vietnam) Vios	(Vietnam) Fawkes	(Vietnam) Dyaz	(Vietnam) Alex (Vietnam) Hero	
Ultimate	(Vietnam) Hope	(Vietnam) Tarzan	(Vietnam) BlazeS	(Vietnam) Jacob (Vietnam) BeeOne	(Vietnam) Hyojin	(Vietnam) Tear
Young Generation	(Vietnam) Ren (Vietnam) NhocTy	(Vietnam) Venus	(Vietnam) Naul	(Vietnam) Bigkoro	(Vietnam) Palette (Vietnam) Min	
LG Red	(Vietnam) Sunsieu	(Vietnam) Ciel	(Vietnam) Irean	(Vietnam) White (Vietnam) EasyLove	(Vietnam) Akeno	

== Results ==
=== Group stage ===
- 7 June - 6 August
- Round robin format.

#	Team	~	GAM	YG	EHU	FFQ	UTM	CR	LGR	FIG	W	L	±
1	GIGABYTE Marines	GAM	~	1−1	2−0	2−0	2−0	2−0	2−0	2−0	13	1	+12
2	Young Generation	YG	1−1	~	1−1	1−1	1−1	2−0	2−0	2−0	10	4	+6
3	e.Hub United	EHU	0−2	1−1	~	1−1	2−0	1−1	2−0	2−0	9	5	+4
4	Friends Forever Gaming	FFQ	0−2	1−1	1−1	~	1−1	2−0	1−1	2−0	8	6	+2
5	Ultimate	UTM	0−2	1−1	0−2	1−1	~	2−0	2−0	2−0	8	6	+2
6	Cherry Esports	CR	0−2	0−2	1−1	0−2	0−2	1−1	~	2−0	4	10	−6
7	LG Red	LGR	0−2	0−2	0−2	1−1	0−2	0−2	~	2−0	3	11	−8
8	Fighters Gaming	FIG	0−2	0−2	0−2	0−2	0−2	1−1	0−2	~	1	13	−12

=== Playoffs ===
- 9 August - 13 August
Rosters

Teams	Players					
Teams	Top	Jungle	Mid	ADC	Support	Coach
Boba Marines	(Vietnam) Archie (Vietnam) Nevan	(Vietnam) Levi	(Vietnam) Optimus	(Vietnam) Noway	(Vietnam) Sya	(Vietnam) Tinikun
Friends Forever	(Vietnam) KingJ	(Vietnam) Haeven	(Vietnam) PotM (Vietnam) Lies	(Vietnam) Celebrity	(Vietnam) Sergh	(Vietnam) Junie
Young Generation	(Vietnam) Ren (Vietnam) NhocTy	(Vietnam) Venus	(Vietnam) Naul	(Vietnam) Bigkoro	(Vietnam) Palette	
e.Hub United	(Vietnam) Taurus (Vietnam) Keiko	(Vietnam) Xuhao	(Vietnam) Empty	(Vietnam) Zin	(Vietnam) CombatLao	(Vietnam) NIXWATER

Results

Ba Ria - Vung Tau

- Round 1

  e.Hub United 0−3 Friends Forever [3]

- Round 2

  Young Generation 3−1 Friends Forever

- Final

  GIGABYTE Marines 3−0 Young Generation

== Final standings ==
₫ 800,000,000 Vietnamese Dong are spread among the teams as seen below:

Place	Prize	Team	Qualification
1st	₫250,000,000	GIGABYTE Marines	2017 GPL Spring
2nd	₫160,000,000	Young Generation	2017 GPL Spring
3rd	₫110,000,000	Friends Forever	
4th	₫85,000,000	e.Hub United	
5th	₫70,000,000	Ultimate	
6th	₫60,000,000	Cherry Esports	
7th	₫50,000,000	LG Red	Summer Promotion
8th	₫40,000,000	Fighters Gaming	Summer Promotion
