= Vietnam Championship Series A 2013 Winter Season =

Video game competition

2013 VCS A Winter
- 2013

Tournament information
- Sport: League of Legends
- Dates: 2 November–17 December
- Administrator: Garena Vietnam
- Host: Vietnam
- Teams: 8

Final positions
- Champions: Xgame
- Runner-up: Hanoi Dragons

The 2013 Vietnam Championship Series A Winter Season is the first split of the first season of Vietnam's fully professional League of Legends league after renaming from Glorious Arena.

== Format ==
- 8 teams participate
- Double round robin
- Matches are best of one
- Top 5 teams qualify for 2014 GPL Spring Vietnamese Qualifier
- 6th and 7th place teams play in 2014 VCS A Spring Promotion
- 8th place team is relegated to 2014 VCS B Spring Round I

== Participants ==
Top 8 team from 2013 VCS A Winter Qualifiers

| Team(s) | ID |
|---|---|
| (Vietnam) Beautiful Life Gaming | BLG |
| (Vietnam) Game Thai Nguyen | GTN |
| (Vietnam) Hanoi Dragons | HND |
| (Vietnam) Hanoi Stars | HNS |
| (Vietnam) HoL Thunder Galaxy | HoL |
| (Vietnam) Nha Trang E-power | EPOW |
| (Vietnam) StarsBoba | SB |
| (Vietnam) Xgame | XG |

=== Rosters ===
| Teams | Players | | | | |
| Teams | Top | Jungle | Mid | ADC | Support |
|---|---|---|---|---|---|
| Hanoi Stars | (Vietnam) Venus | (Vietnam) Mercury | (Vietnam) Neptune (Vietnam) MidOr2Mid | (Vietnam) Pluto (Vietnam) Longtae | (Vietnam) Mars |
| Hanoi Dragons | (Vietnam) VirusS (Vietnam) 420 | (Vietnam) Leon | (Vietnam) Noah (Vietnam) KingOfWar | (Vietnam) Kai | (Vietnam) Jest |
| Game Thai Nguyen | (Vietnam) RemmySon | (Vietnam) ISS | (Vietnam) Gin | (Vietnam) ĐacThang | (Vietnam) QuangỐc |
| Nha Trang E-power | (Vietnam) Lucky | (Vietnam) Melt | (Vietnam) MrSilver (Vietnam) Glory | (Vietnam) Flaming | (Vietnam) TiếuHố (Vietnam) Cupid |
| Beautiful Life Gaming | (Vietnam) LilinSS | (Vietnam) MeoU | (Vietnam) Tentei | (Vietnam) Rico (Vietnam) Babie | (Vietnam) Nobita |
| Xgame | (Vietnam) Oxi | (Vietnam) Crych | (Vietnam) Navy | (Vietnam) Vigoss | (Vietnam) BaRoiBeo |
| StarsBoba | (Vietnam) Brian (Vietnam) Sunny | (Vietnam) SoSoon (Vietnam) TrumVe | (Vietnam) Nero (Vietnam) Madboy | (Vietnam) Sin (Vietnam) Sad | (Vietnam) Sol |
| HoL Thunder Galaxy | (Vietnam) Tearsword | (Vietnam) Jinkey | (Vietnam) Jupiter | (Vietnam) Destiny | (Vietnam) Tuniverse |

== Results ==
=== Group stage ===
Matches are best of one

| # | Team | ~ | XG | HND | BLG | SB | GTN | HoL | EPOW | HNS | W | L | ± |
|---|---|---|---|---|---|---|---|---|---|---|---|---|---|
| 1 | Xgame | XG | ~ | 1−1 | 2−0 | 2−0 | 0−2 | 2−0 | 2−0 | 2−0 | 11 | 3 | +8 |
| 2 | Hanoi Dragons | HND | 1−1 | ~ | 1−1 | 2−0 | 1−1 | 2−0 | 1−1 | 2−0 | 10 | 4 | +6 |
| 3 | Beautiful Life Gaming | BLG | 0−2 | 1−1 | ~ | 2−0 | 1−1 | 1−1 | 1−1 | 2−0 | 8 | 6 | +2 |
| 4 | StarsBoba | SB | 0−2 | 0−2 | 0−2 | ~ | 2−0 | 2−0 | 2−0 | 2−0 | 8 | 6 | +2 |
| 5 | Game Thai Nguyen | GTN | 2−0 | 1−1 | 1−1 | 0−2 | ~ | 0−2 | 2−0 | 1−1 | 7 | 7 | +0 |
| 6 | HoL Thunder Galaxy | HoL | 0−2 | 0−2 | 1−1 | 0−2 | 2−0 | ~ | 1−1 | 2−0 | 6 | 8 | −2 |
| 7 | Nha Trang E-power | EPOW | 0−2 | 1−1 | 0−2 | 0−2 | 1−1 | 1−1 | ~ | 2−0 | 5 | 9 | −4 |
| 8 | Hanoi Stars | HNS | 0−2 | 0−2 | 0−2 | 0−2 | 1−1 | 0−2 | 0−2 | ~ | 1 | 13 | −12 |

- 3rd Place Tiebreaker Beautiful Life Gaming 1−0 StarsBoba

== Final standings ==
₫200,000,000 Vietnamese Dong are spread among the teams as seen below:

| Place | Prize | Team | Qualification |
|---|---|---|---|
| 1st | ₫70,000,000 | Xgame | 2014 GPL Spring Vietnamese Qualifier |
| 2nd | ₫40,000,000 | Hanoi Dragons | 2014 GPL Spring Vietnamese Qualifier |
| 3rd | ₫25,000,000 | Beautiful Life Gaming | 2014 GPL Spring Vietnamese Qualifier |
| 4th | ₫20,000,000 | StarBoba | 2014 GPL Spring Vietnamese Qualifier |
| 5th | ₫15,000,000 | Game Thái Nguyên | 2014 GPL Spring Vietnamese Qualifier |
| 6th | ₫12,000,000 | HoL Thunder Galaxy | |
| 7th | ₫10,000,000 | Nha Trang E-power | |
| 8th | ₫8,000,000 | Hanoi Stars | |
