= 2016 Vietnam Championship Series A Summer Season =

2016 VCS A Spring
- 2016

Tournament information
- Sport: League of Legends
- Dates: 20 May–31 July
- Administrator: Garena Vietnam
- Host: Vietnam
- Teams: 10

Final positions
- Champions: Saigon Jokers
- Runner-up: Saigon Mongaming

The 2016 Vietnam Championship Series A Summer Season is the split of the seventh season of Vietnam's fully professional League of Legends. The official name of the tournament became the Mountain Dew Championship Series.

== Format ==
- 10 qualified teams.

- 5 teams from 2016 VCS A Spring.
- 5 teams from 2016 VCS A Summer Promotion.
- Round robin format.
- Each match is best of one.
- Each team plays all of the other teams twice.

- Playoffs

- 4 qualified teams.
- Each match is best of five.

== Participants ==
Team(s)	ID
(Vietnam) Boba Marines	BM
(Vietnam) Saigon Jokers	SAJ
(Vietnam) Hanoi Fate	HF
(Vietnam) An Phat Ultimate	APU
(Vietnam) SuperHype Gaming (Note: Hanoi Team Demons renamed to SuperHype Gaming.)	SHG
(Vietnam) Cherry Esports (Note: Cherry Esports renamed to KienGiang Imba.)	CR
(Vietnam) T Team	TT
(Vietnam) Hanoi Skyred	HSR
(Vietnam) 269 Gaming	269
(Vietnam) Saigon Mongaming (Note: ZOTAC United renamed to Saigon Mongaming.)	SGM

=== Rosters ===
Teams	Players				
Teams	Top	Jungle	Mid	ADC	Support
Boba Marines	(Vietnam) QTV	(Vietnam) Tik	(Vietnam) PotM	(Vietnam) Optimus	(Vietnam) Archie
269 Gaming	(Vietnam) KingJ	(Vietnam) Heaven	(Vietnam) Hafa	(Vietnam) Zin	(Vietnam) Sergh
SuperHype Gaming	(Vietnam) Ness	(Vietnam) Fury	(Vietnam) DHNN	(Vietnam) Miracle	(Vietnam) Kudol
Hanoi Fate	(Vietnam) LuckyMan (Vietnam) iLoda	(Vietnam) MeoU	(Vietnam) Jinky	(Vietnam) Lysna	(Vietnam) Akiho
Saigon Jokers	(Vietnam) Row (Vietnam) yT	(Vietnam) HanYiAnn	(Vietnam) Warzone (Vietnam) Lovida	(Vietnam) Slay (Vietnam) Celebrity	(Vietnam) TSU (Vietnam) RonOP
Cherry Esports	(Vietnam) Mini	(Vietnam) Hari	(Vietnam) Eagle	(Vietnam) Brian (Vietnam) BOo	(Vietnam) Kaii
An Phat Ultimate	(Vietnam) Hope	(Vietnam) Tarzan	(Vietnam) Dragon	(Vietnam) HyoJin (Vietnam) BeeOne	(Vietnam) Whis (Vietnam) Tear
T Team	(Vietnam) ThuyTien	(Vietnam) Banana	(Vietnam) Lucifer	(Vietnam) Sandy	(Vietnam) JQK
Hanoi SkyRed	(Vietnam) Ren	(Vietnam) Shyn	(Vietnam) Levi (Vietnam) Zeroday	(Vietnam) Noway	(Vietnam) Yesway
Saigon Mongaming	(Vietnam) Kidz	(Vietnam) Exo	(Vietnam) Petland	(Vietnam) Clear	(Vietnam) BaRoiBeo

== Results ==
=== Group stage ===
- Round robin format.
- Each match is best of one.

#	Team	~	SAJ	SGM	APU	BM	HSR	HF	269	SHG	TT	CR	W	L	±
1	Saigon Jokers	SAJ	~	4−0	3−1	2−2	3−1	2−2	4−0	2−2	4−0	3−1	27	9	+18
2	Saigon Mongaming	SGM	0−4	~	2−2	1−3	1−3	4−0	3−1	3−1	4−0	4−0	22	14	+8
3	An Phat Ultimate	APU	1−3	2−2	~	3−1	2−2	4−0	2−2	2−2	2−2	4−0	22	14	+8
4	Boba Marines	BM	2−2	3−1	1−3	~	2−2	3−1	3−1	2−2	3−1	3−1	22	14	+8
5	Hanoi SkyRed	HSR	1−3	3−1	2−2	2−2	~	1−3	2−2	4−0	2−2	3−1	20	16	+4
6	Hanoi Fate	HF	2−2	0−4	0−4	1−3	3−1	~	2−2	4−0	3−1	3−1	18	18	+0
7	269 Gaming	269	0−4	1−3	2−2	1−3	2−2	2−2	~	3−1	4−0	4−0	19	17	+2
8	SuperHype Gaming	SHG	2−2	1−3	2−2	2−2	0−4	0−4	1−3	~	4−0	2−2	14	22	−8
9	T Team	TT	0−4	0−4	2−2	1−3	2−2	1−3	0−4	0−4	~	2−2	8	28	−20
10	Cherry Esports	CR	1−3	0−4	0−4	1−3	1−3	1−3	0−4	2−2	2−2	~	8	28	−20

Tiebreakers
- 9−10th tiebreakers:

Cherry Esports 0−1 T Team

- 5,6−7th tiebreakers:

269 Gaming 0−1 Hanoi SkyRed
Hanoi SkyRed 0−1 Hanoi Fate
Hanoi Fate 0−1 269 Gaming

=== Playoffs ===
Rosters

Teams	Players				
Teams	Top	Jungle	Mid	ADC	Support
Boba Marines	(Vietnam) QTV	(Vietnam) Tik	(Vietnam) Optimus	(Vietnam) PotM	(Vietnam) Archie (Vietnam) KenT
An Phat Ultimate	(Vietnam) Hope	(Vietnam) Tarzan	(Vietnam) Whis	(Vietnam) BeeOne	(Vietnam) Tear
Saigon Mongaming	(Vietnam) Kidz	(Vietnam) Exo	(Vietnam) Petland	(Vietnam) Clear	(Vietnam) BaRoiBeo (Vietnam) Akeno
Saigon Jokers	(Vietnam) Row (Vietnam) yT	(Vietnam) HanYiAnn (Vietnam) Heaven	(Vietnam) Warzone (Vietnam) Lovida	(Vietnam) Slay (Vietnam) Celebrity	(Vietnam) TSU (Vietnam) RonOP

Playoffs

Semi-finals
30 July
Saigon Mongaming	3
An Phat Ultimate	2
30 July
Saigon Jokers	3
Boba Marines	0

Finals
31 July
Saigon Mongaming	0
Saigon Jokers	3
3rd-place match
31 July
An Phat Ultimate	3
Boba Marines	0

== Final standings ==
₫ 1,000,000,000 Vietnamese Dong are spread among the teams as seen below:

Place	Prize	Team	Qualification
1st	₫250,000,000	Saigon Jokers	2016 GPL Summer
2nd	₫170,000,000	Saigon Mongaming	
3rd	₫130,000,000	An Phat Ultimate	
4th	₫100,000,000	Boba Marines	
5th	₫85,000,000	Hanoi Skyred	
6th	₫70,000,000	Hanoi Fate	
7th	₫60,000,000	269 Gaming	2017 VCS A Spring Promotion
8th	₫50,000,000	SuperHype Gaming	2017 VCS A Spring Promotion
9th	₫45,000,000	T Team	2017 VCS A Spring Promotion
10th	₫40,000,000	Cherry Esports	2017 VCS A Spring Promotion
