= 2016 GPL season =

Ninth edition of the Garena Premier League

- League: Garena Premier League
- Sport: League of Legends
- Duration: 6 April – 10 April (Spring); 8 August – 14 August (Summer)
- Teams: 6

Spring Split
- Champions: (Vietnam) Saigon Jokers
- Runners-up: (Thailand) Bangkok Titans

Summer Split
- Champions: (Vietnam) Saigon Jokers
- Runners-up: (Thailand) Bangkok Titans

GPL seasons
- ← 2015 2017 →

The 2016 GPL season was the fifth edition of the Garena Premier League, a Riot Games-organised tournament for League of Legends, the multiplayer online battle arena video game. It is a fully professional League of Legends league over all of the Southeast Asia region, with 6 teams from 6 countries/areas to determine which team is the best in the region, and is the qualification tournament for Southeast Asian teams to play at the 2016 International Wildcard Invitational.

== Spring ==
=== Format ===
- Group Stage (Apr 6-8)

- Single round robin
- All matches are best of one

- ' Knockout Stage (Apr 9-10)

- Single Elimination
- All matches are best of five

=== Participants ===
6 teams from 6 countries/areas

Countries	Slot	League	Team	ID
Vietnam	1	VCS	(Vietnam) Saigon Jokers	SAJ
Singapore	1	TLC SG	(Singapore) Team Rigel	RG
Philippines	1	PGS	(Philippines) Imperium Pro Team	IPT
Thailand	1	TPL	(Thailand) Bangkok Titans	BKT
Indonesia	1	LGS	(Indonesia) Kanaya Gaming	KG
Malaysia	1	TPL MY	(Malaysia) KL Hunters	KLH

=== Results ===
==== Group stage ====
Double Round Robin. Top 4 teams advance to Bracket Stage.

#	Team	~	BKT	IPT	SAJ	KLH	RG	KG	W	L	±
1	(Thailand) Bangkok Titans	BKT	~	1−0	1−0	0−1	1−0	1−0	4	1	+3
2	(Philippines) Imperium Pro Team	IPT	0−1	~	1−0	1−0	1−0	1−0	4	1	+3
3	(Vietnam) Saigon Jokers	SAJ	0−1	0−1	~	1−0	1−0	1−0	3	2	+1
4	(Malaysia) KL Hunters	KLH	1−0	0−1	1−0	~	0−1	1−0	3	2	+1
5	(Singapore) Team Rigel	RG	0−1	0−1	0−1	0−1	~	1−0	1	4	−3
6	(Indonesia) Kanaya Gaming	KG	0−1	0−1	0−1	0−1	0−1	~	0	5	−5

==== Bracket Stage ====
- 1st place team of Group Stage chooses between 3rd and 4th place to be their semifinal opponent (BKT chooses KLH)
- Matches are best of five.

Semi-finals
April 9
(Thailand) Bangkok Titans	3
(Malaysia) KL Hunter	1
April 9
(Philippines) Imperium Pro Team	1
(Vietnam) Saigon Joker	3

Final
April 10
(Vietnam) Saigon Joker	3
(Thailand) Bangkok Titans	1

=== Final standings ===
Place	Team	Qualification
1st	(Vietnam) Saigon Joker	2016 IWCI
2nd	(Thailand) Bangkok Titans	
3rd-4th	(Philippines) Imperium Pro Team	
3rd-4th	(Malaysia) KL Hunter	
5th	(Singapore) Team Rigel	
6th	(Indonesia) Kanaya Gaming	

== Summer ==
=== Format ===
- Group Stage (Apr 6-8)

- Single round robin
- All matches are best of one

- ' Knockout Stage (Apr 9-10)

- Single Elimination
- All matches are best of five

=== Participants ===
6 teams from 6 countries/areas

Countries	Slot	League	Team	ID
Vietnam	1	VCS	(Vietnam) Saigon Jokers	SAJ
Singapore	1	TLC SG	(Singapore) Vestigial	VTL
Philippines	1	PGS	(Philippines) Acclaim EmpireX	AEX
Thailand	1	TPL	(Thailand) Bangkok Titans	BKT
Indonesia	1	LGS	(Indonesia) Kanaya Gaming	KG
Malaysia	1	TPL MY	(Malaysia) KL Hunters	KLH

=== Results ===
==== Group stage ====
Double Round Robin. Top 4 teams advance to Bracket Stage.

#	Team	~	SAJ	BKT	KLH	VTL	AEX	KG	W	L	±
1	(Vietnam) Saigon Jokers	SAJ	~	0−1	1−0	1−0	1−0	1−0	4	1	+3
2	(Thailand) Bangkok Titans	BKT	1−0	~	1−0	0−1	0−1	1−0	3	2	+1
3	(Malaysia) LK Hunters	KHL	0−1	0−1	~	1−0	1−0	1−0	3	2	+1
4	(Singapore) Vestigial	VTL	0−1	1−0	0−1	~	1−0	1−0	3	2	+1
5	(Philippines) Acclaim EmpireX	AEX	0−1	1−0	0−1	0−1	~	1−0	2	3	−1
6	(Indonesia) Kanaya Gaming	KG	0−1	0−1	0−1	0−1	0−1	~	0	5	−5

===== Tiebreakers =====
#	Team	~	BKT	KLH	VTL	W	L	±
2	(Thailand) Bangkok Titans	BKT	~	1−0	1−0	2	0	+1
3	(Malaysia) KL Hunters	KLH	0−1	~	1−0	1	1	0
4	(Singapore) Vestigial	VTL	0−1	0−1	~	0	2	-2

==== Bracket Stage ====
- 1st place team of Group Stage chooses between 3rd and 4th place to be their semifinal opponent
- Matches are best of five.

Semi-finals
August 13
(Thailand) Bangkok Titans	3
(Malaysia) KL Hunter	0
August 13
(Singapore) Vestigial	0
(Vietnam) Saigon Joker	3

Final
August 14
(Thailand) Bangkok Titans	2
(Vietnam) Saigon Joker	3

=== Final standings ===
Place	Team	Qualification
1st	(Vietnam) Saigon Joker	2016 IWCQ
2nd	(Thailand) Bangkok Titans	
3rd-4th	(Singapore) Vestigial	
3rd-4th	(Malaysia) KL Hunter	
5th	(Philippines) Acclaim EmpireX	
6th	(Indonesia) Kanaya Gaming	
