= Mineski Global =

Philippine esports company

- Industry: Video gaming
- Founded: December 2009; 16 years ago
- Founder: Ronald Robins
- Headquarters: San Juan, Metro Manila, Philippines
- Area served: Southeast Asia
- Brands: Mineski Infinity (internet café chain)
- Services: Esports tournament organization
- Divisions: Mineski Esports; Mineski Academy; Mineski Talent; Mineski Tech; Mineski Spaces
- Website: www.mineskiglobal.com

Mineski Global, commonly known as Mineski, is an esports organization established in December 2009 in the Philippines. It is an offshoot of Mineski-DOTA team which was founded in 2004.

== History ==
Mineski Global's roots is traced to the Mineski-DOTA esports team which was founded on February 14, 2004, by Filipino gamer Ronald Robins and his teammates in Manila, Philippines. The team competed in various domestic and international competitions including the World Cyber Games.

In 2008, Mineski opened the first outlet of its Mineski Infinity internet café chain. In December 2009, shortly after Robins retired, Robins and his former teammates went on to establish Mineski as a company to manage Mineski Infinity. It also started from organizing localized esports competitions hosted in its internet cafes to holding international esports tournaments.

The esports company eventually expanded to establish presence in Indonesia and Thailand. In June 2019, Mineski inaugurated its new corporate headquarters in San Juan, Metro Manila.

In April 2021, the Philippine government's regulatory body for professional sports Games and Amusements Board (GAB) issued a show-cause order against Mineski for holding esports tournaments with GAB's sanction. Mineski in response assured the public that it is cooperating with GAB regarding the matter.

== Divisions ==
Mineski Global has five divisions, namely:

- Mineski Esports – the company's marketing and events organizing arm.
- Mineski Academy – esports training and grassroots.
- Mineski Talent – responsible for the scouting and management of Mineski's esports athletes and influencers.
- Mineski Tech – gaming equipment arm.
- Mineski Spaces – manages the company's internet cafe chain, Mineski Infinity.

== Partnerships ==
In February 2020, Mineski entered a partnership agreement with the Philippine Collegiate Champions League in a bid to develop a school-based esports program.
