= Vietnam Championship Series A 2014 Spring Season =

Video game competition

2014 VCS A Spring
- 2014

Tournament information
- Sport: League of Legends
- Dates: 22 February–13 April
- Administrator: Garena Vietnam
- Host: Vietnam
- Teams: 8

Final positions
- Champions: Ozone Cutie Monsters
- Runner-up: Hanoi Dragons

The 2014 Vietnam Championship Series A Spring Season is the second split of the first season of Vietnam's fully professional League of Legends, With the sponsorship of Dell, the tournament is known as Dell Championship Serie A.

== Format ==
- 8 teams participate
- Round robin matches.
- Each team plays all of the other teams 2 times.
- Each match is Best of one.
- Top 3 teams receives a spot for the 2014 GPL Summer Vietnamese Qualifier.
- Bottom 3 teams drop into the 2014 VCS A Summer Qualifier.

== Participants ==
Team(s)	ID
(Vietnam) CM Storm CG	CMS
(Vietnam) Game Thai Nguyen	GTN
(Vietnam) Hanoi Dragons	HND
(Vietnam) Hanoi Phoenix	HNP
(Vietnam) Hanoi SkyRed	HSR
(Vietnam) Hanoi Fate	HF
(Vietnam) Team Ozone Cutie Monsters	OZCM
(Vietnam) Saigon TopGame (Note: Saigon Xgame renamed to Saigon TopGame)	TG

=== Rosters ===
Teams	Players				
Teams	Top	Jungle	Mid	ADC	Support
CM Storm CG	(Vietnam) Blackest9	(Vietnam) GMN	(Vietnam) Jigoku	(Vietnam) Warzone (Vietnam) Frenzy	(Vietnam) Ghost.G (Vietnam) yuju
Hanoi Dragons	(Vietnam) LilinSS	(Vietnam) KingOfWar	(Vietnam) Tentei	(Vietnam) Kai	(Vietnam) Babie
Game Thai Nguyen	(Vietnam) RemmySon	(Vietnam) Gin	(Vietnam) Bi	(Vietnam) DẮC THẮNG	(Vietnam) Quang Ốc
Hanoi Fate	(Vietnam) Slay	(Vietnam) Burn (Vietnam) Jully	(Vietnam) Shady (Czech Republic) Kane (Vietnam) Jinky	(Vietnam) Lysna	(Vietnam) Akiho (Vietnam) Zubu
Hanoi Phoenix	(Vietnam) Malavita	(Vietnam) Change	(Vietnam) Lucifer	(Vietnam) Lolita (Vietnam) Insane	(Vietnam) Leon (Vietnam) Jangmi (Vietnam) Dark
Hanoi SkyRed	(Vietnam) StormEye	(Vietnam) ProE	(Vietnam) HianRy (Vietnam) Youtan	(Vietnam) HeOpeO	(Vietnam) TrungBi
Saigon TopGame	(Vietnam) JustA701	(Vietnam) Navy	(Vietnam) Crych	(Vietnam) BaroiBeo	(Vietnam) Sunny
Ozone Cutie Monsters	(Vietnam) Percy	(Vietnam) Fury	(Vietnam) Crit (Vietnam) Henry	(Vietnam) TTR	(Vietnam) Miuky

== Results ==
=== Group stage ===
Matches are best of one

#	Team	~	OZCM	HND	HF	TG	HSR	GTN	HNP	CMS	W	L	±
1	Team Ozone Cutie Monsters	OZCM	~	1−1	2−0	1−1	2−0	2−0	2−0	2−0	12	2	+10
2	Hanoi Dragons	HND	1−1	~	1−1	2−0	2−0	1−1	2−0	2−0	11	3	+8
3	Hanoi Fate	HF	0−2	1−1	~	2−0	1−1	1−1	2−0	2−0	9	5	+4
4	Saigon TopGame	TG	1−1	0−2	0−2	~	1−1	2−0	1−1	2−0	7	7	+0
5	Hanoi SkyRed	HSR	0−2	0−2	1−1	1−1	~	1−1	2−0	2−0	7	7	+0
6	Game Thai Nguyen	GTN	0−2	1−1	1−1	0−2	1−1	~	1−1	2−0	6	8	−2
7	Hanoi Phoenix	HNP	0−2	0−2	0−2	1−1	0−2	1−1	~	2−0	4	10	−6
8	CM Storm CG	CMS	0−2	0−2	0−2	0−2	0−2	0−2	0−2	~	0	14	−14

- 4th Place Tiebreaker Hanoi SkyRed 0−1 Saigon TopGame

== Final standings ==
₫300,000,000 Vietnamese Dong are spread among the teams as seen below:

Place	Prize	Team	Qualification
1st	₫100,000,000	Ozone Cutie Monsters	2014 GPL Summer Vietnamese Qualifier
2nd	₫60,000,000	Hanoi Dragons	2014 GPL Summer Vietnamese Qualifier
3rd	₫40,000,000	Hanoi Fate	2014 GPL Summer Vietnamese Qualifier
4th	₫30,000,000	Saigon TopGame	
5th	₫25,000,000	Hanoi SkyRed	
6th	₫20,000,000	Game Thai Nguyen	
7th	₫15,000,000	Hanoi Phonenix	
8th	₫10,000,000	CM Storm CG	
