= 2014 GPL season =

Asian esports league season

- League: Garena Premier League
- Sport: League of Legends
- Duration: 30 October – 11 January (Winter); 12 February – 6 April (Spring); 11 June – 16 August (Summer)
- Teams: 12

Winter Split
- Champions: (Taiwan) Taipei Assassins
- Runners-up: (Taiwan) Taipei Snipers

Spring Split
- Champions: (Taiwan) Taipei Assassins
- Runners-up: (Taiwan) ahq eSports Club

Summer Split
- Champions: (Taiwan) Taipei Assassins
- Runners-up: (Taiwan) ahq eSports Club

GPL seasons
- ← 2013 2015 →

The 2014 GPL season was the third edition of the Garena Premier League, a Riot Games-organized tournament for League of Legends.

== Winter ==
=== Format ===
- Group Stage

- 12 teams from 6 countries/areas.
- Divided into 2 groups with 6 teams each.
- Double Round Robin, Best of One matches.
- Top four teams of each group advance to the bracket stage.
- If teams tie-up, rank will be decided by match results between these teams.
- Extra games will be played if still tied.

- Tie Break Games

- 2 Teams: BO1 Match.
- 3 Teams: Round Robin group, if still tied, play single elimination bracket.
- 4 Teams: Round of 4 bracket.
- 5 Teams: Round of 4 bracket with another match before.

- Bracket Stage

- Single Elimination.
- All bracket stage games are best of five.

=== Participants ===
12 teams from 7 countries/areas

| Counties | Team(s) | ID |
|---|---|---|
| Vietnam | (Vietnam) Saigon Jokers | SAJ |
| Vietnam | (Vietnam) Saigon Fantastic Five | SF5 |
| Vietnam | (Vietnam) Full Louis | FL |
| Taiwan | (Taiwan) Taipei Assassins | TPA |
| Taiwan | (Taiwan) ahq eSports Club | ahq |
| Taiwan | (Taiwan) Taipei Snipers | TPS |
| Hong Kong | (Hong Kong) HK Attitude | HKA |
| Malaysia | (Malaysia) KL Hunters | KLH |
| Singapore | Singapore Sentinels | SGS |
| Thailand | (Thailand) Bangkok Titans | BKT |
| Thailand | (Thailand) Team Infinite | IFN |
| Philippines | (Philippines) Mineski | MSK |

=== Results ===
==== Group stage ====
Group A

| # | Team | ~ | TPA | ahq | SAJ | MSK | KLH | IFN | W | L | ± |
|---|---|---|---|---|---|---|---|---|---|---|---|
| 1 | (Taiwan) Taipei Assassins | TPA | ~ | 1−1 | 2−0 | 1−1 | 2−0 | 2−0 | 8 | 2 | +6 |
| 2 | (Taiwan) ahq eSports Club | ahq | 1−1 | ~ | 1−1 | 2−0 | 2−0 | 2−0 | 8 | 2 | +6 |
| 3 | (Vietnam) Saigon Joker | SAJ | 0−2 | 1−1 | ~ | 1−1 | 1−1 | 2−0 | 5 | 5 | 0 |
| 4 | (Philippines) Mineski | MSK | 1−1 | 0−2 | 1−1 | ~ | 1−1 | 2−0 | 5 | 5 | 0 |
| 5 | (Malaysia) KL Hunters | KLH | 0−2 | 0−2 | 1−1 | 1−1 | ~ | 2−0 | 4 | 6 | −2 |
| 6 | (Thailand) Team Infinite | TFN | 0−2 | 0−2 | 0−2 | 0−2 | 0−2 | ~ | 0 | 10 | −10 |

- Tiebreaker

- 1st Place Tiebreaker (Taiwan) ahq eSports Club 0−1 Taipei Assassins (Taiwan)
- 3rd Place Tiebreaker (Vietnam) Saigon Joker 1−0 Mineski (Philippines)

Group B

| # | Team | ~ | TPS | HKA | SGS | FL | SF5 | BKT | W | L | ± |
|---|---|---|---|---|---|---|---|---|---|---|---|
| 1 | (Taiwan) Taipei Snipers | TPS | ~ | 1−1 | 1−1 | 2−0 | 2−0 | 2−0 | 8 | 2 | +6 |
| 2 | Hong Kong Attitude | HKA | 1−1 | ~ | 2−0 | 1−1 | 2−0 | 2−0 | 8 | 2 | +6 |
| 3 | Singapore Sentinels | SGS | 1−1 | 0−2 | ~ | 1−1 | 2−0 | 2−0 | 6 | 4 | +2 |
| 4 | (Vietnam) Full Louis | FL | 0−2 | 1−1 | 1−1 | ~ | 2−0 | 2−0 | 6 | 4 | +2 |
| 5 | (Vietnam) Saigon Fantatic 5 | SF5 | 0−2 | 0−2 | 0−2 | 0−2 | ~ | 1−1 | 1 | 9 | −8 |
| 6 | (Thailand) Bangkok Titans | BKT | 0−2 | 0−2 | 0−2 | 0−2 | 1−1 | ~ | 1 | 9 | −8 |

- Tiebreaker

- 1st Place Tiebreaker Hong Kong Attitude 0−1 Taipei Snipers (Taiwan)
- 3rd Place Tiebreaker Singapore Sentinels 1−0 Full Louis (Vietnam)
- 5th Place Tiebreaker (Vietnam) Saigon Fantatic 5 1−0 Bangkok Titans (Thailand)

==== Bracket Stage ====
- Eight teams are drawn into a best-of-five single elimination bracket.
- Teams of the same group can not play each other until the finals.
- All matches are best-of-five.

Quarter-finals
4 December
Taipei Assassins | 3
Full Louis | 0
6 December
Saigon Joker | 3
Hong Kong Attitude | 1
11 December
ahq eSports Club | 3
Singapore Sentinels | 0
13 December
Mineski | 0
Taipei Snipers | 3

Semi-finals
18 December
Taipei Assassins | 3
Saigon Joker | 2
20 December
ahq eSports Club | 0
Taipei Snipers | 3

Final
11 January
Taipei Assassins | 3
Taipei Snipers | 2
Third place match
8 January
Saigon Joker | 1
ahq eSports Club | 3

=== Final standings ===
$200,000 US Dollars are spread among the teams as seen below:

| Place | Team | Circuit Points | Prize money |
|---|---|---|---|
| 1st | (Taiwan) Taipei Assassins | 400 | $50,000 |
| 2nd | (Taiwan) Taipei Snipers | 200 | $25,000 |
| 3rd | (Taiwan) ahq eSports Club | 150 | $10,000 |
| 4th | (Vietnam) Saigon Jokers | 100 | $5,000 |
| 5−8 | (Philippines) Mineski | 100 | $2,500 |
| 5−8 | Singapore Sentinels | 100 | $2,500 |
| 5−8 | (Hong Kong) HK Attitude | 100 | $2,500 |
| 5−8 | (Vietnam) Full Louis | 100 | $2,500 |
| 9−10 | (Malaysia) KL Hunters | 40 | $2,500 |
| 9−10 | (Vietnam) Saigon Fantastic 5 | 40 | $2,500 |
| 11−12 | (Thailand) Team Infinite | 20 | $2,500 |
| 11−12 | (Thailand) Bangkok Titans | 20 | $2,500 |

== Spring ==
=== Format ===
- Group Stage
- 12 teams from 5 countries/areas.
- Divided into 2 groups with 6 teams each.

- Double Round Robin, Best of One matches.
- Top four teams of each group advance to the bracket stage.
- If teams tie-up, rank will be decided by match results between these teams.

- Extra games will be played if still tied.

- Tie Break Games

- 2 Teams: Best-of-One Match.
- 3 Teams: Round Robin group, if still tied, play single elimination bracket.
- 4 Teams: Round of 4 bracket.
- 5 Teams: Round of 4 bracket with another match before.

- Bracket Stage

- Single Elimination.
- All bracket stage matches are best of five.
- The final game is Blind Pick while other games are Draft Pick

=== Participants ===
12 teams from 5 countries/areas

| Counties | Team(s) | ID |
|---|---|---|
| Taiwan | (Taiwan) Taipei Assassins | TPA |
| Taiwan | (Taiwan) Taipei Snipers | TPS |
| Taiwan | (Taiwan) ahq eSports Club | ahq |
| Taiwan | (Taiwan) yoe Flash Wolves | yFW |
| Vietnam | (Vietnam) Saigon Jokers | SAJ |
| Vietnam | (Vietnam) Saigon Fantastic Five | SF5 |
| Vietnam | (Vietnam) Full Louis | FL |
| Singapore | Singapore Sentinels | SGS |
| Singapore | (Singapore) Insidious Gaming | iS |
| Philippines | (Philippines) Imperium Pro Team | IPT |
| Philippines | (Philippines) Manila Eagles | MLE |
| Thailand | (Thailand) Bangkok Titans | BKT |

=== Results ===
==== Group stage ====
Group A

| # | Team | ~ | ahq | TPS | SAJ | iS | BKT | IPT | W | L | ± |
|---|---|---|---|---|---|---|---|---|---|---|---|
| 1 | (Taiwan) ahq eSports Club | TPA | ~ | 2−0 | 2−0 | 1−1 | 2−0 | 2−0 | 9 | 1 | +8 |
| 2 | (Taiwan) Taipei Snipers | ahq | 0−2 | ~ | 2−0 | 2−0 | 2−0 | 2−0 | 8 | 2 | +6 |
| 3 | (Vietnam) Saigon Joker | SAJ | 1−1 | 0−2 | ~ | 2−0 | 2−0 | 2−0 | 7 | 3 | +4 |
| 4 | (Singapore) Insidious Gaming | MSK | 0−2 | 0−2 | 0−2 | ~ | 2−0 | 2−0 | 4 | 6 | −2 |
| 5 | (Thailand) Bangkok Titans | BKT | 0−2 | 0−2 | 0−2 | 0−2 | ~ | 2−0 | 2 | 8 | −6 |
| 6 | (Philippines) Imperium Pro Team | IPT | 0−2 | 0−2 | 0−2 | 0−2 | 0−2 | ~ | 0 | 10 | −10 |

Group B

| # | Team | ~ | TPA | SF5 | yFW | SGS | FL | MLE | W | L | ± |
|---|---|---|---|---|---|---|---|---|---|---|---|
| 1 | (Taiwan) Taipei Assassins | TPA | ~ | 2−0 | 2−0 | 2−0 | 2−0 | 2−0 | 10 | 0 | +10 |
| 2 | (Vietnam) Saigon Fantastic 5 | SF5 | 0−2 | ~ | 1−1 | 1−1 | 2−0 | 2−0 | 6 | 4 | +2 |
| 3 | (Taiwan) yoe Flash Wolves | yFW | 0−2 | 1−1 | ~ | 1−1 | 1−1 | 2−0 | 5 | 5 | 0 |
| 4 | Singapore Sentinels | SGS | 0−2 | 1−1 | 1−1 | ~ | 1−1 | 1−1 | 4 | 6 | −2 |
| 5 | (Vietnam) Full Louis | FL | 0−2 | 0−2 | 1−1 | 1−1 | ~ | 1−1 | 3 | 7 | −4 |
| 6 | (Philippines) Manila Eagles | MLE | 0−2 | 0−2 | 0−2 | 1−1 | 1−1 | ~ | 2 | 8 | −6 |

==== Bracket Stage ====
- Eight teams are drawn into a best-of-five single elimination bracket.
- Teams of the same group can not play each other until the finals.
- All matches are best-of-five.

Quarter-finals
19 March
Taipei Snipers | 3
(Taiwan) yoe Flash Wolves | 0
21 March
Taipei Assassins | 3
Insidious Gaming | 0
26 March
Saigon Joker | 3
Saigon Fantastic 5 | 0
28 March
ahq eSports Club | 3
Singapore Sentinels | 0

Semi-finals
5 April
Taipei Snipers | 2
Taipei Assassins | 3
5 April
Saigon Joker | 1
ahq eSports Club | 3

Final
6 April
Taipei Assassins | 3
ahq eSports Club | 2
Third place match
6 April
Taipei Snipers | 3
Saigon Joker | 1

=== Final standings ===
$200,000 US Dollars are spread among the teams as seen below:

| Place | Team | Circuit Points | Prize money |
|---|---|---|---|
| 1st | (Taiwan) Taipei Assassins | 600 | $80,000 |
| 2nd | (Taiwan) ahq eSports Club | 300 | $40,000 |
| 3rd | (Taiwan) Taipei Snipers | 225 | $25,000 |
| 4th | (Vietnam) Saigon Jokers | 150 | $15,000 |
| 5−8 | (Singapore) nsidious Gaming | 105 | $8,000 |
| 5−8 | Singapore Sentinels | 105 | $8,000 |
| 5−8 | (Taiwan) yoe Flash Wolves | 105 | $8,000 |
| 5−8 | (Vietnam) Saigon Fantastic 5 | 105 | $8,000 |
| 9−10 | (Thailand) Bangkok Titans | 60 | $3,000 |
| 9−10 | (Vietnam) Full Louis | 60 | $3,000 |
| 11−12 | (Philippines) Imperium Pro Team | 30 | $1,000 |
| 11−12 | (Philippines) Manila Eagles | 30 | $1,000 |

== Summer ==
=== Format ===
- Group Stage
- 12 teams from 5 countries/areas.
- Divided into 2 groups with 6 teams each.

- Double Round Robin, Best of One matches.
- Top four teams of each group advance to the bracket stage.
- If teams tie-up, rank will be decided by match results between these teams.

- Extra games will be played if still tied.

- Tie Break Games

- 2 Teams: Best-of-One Match.
- 3 Teams: Round Robin group, if still tied, play single elimination bracket.
- 4 Teams: Round of 4 bracket.
- 5 Teams: Round of 4 bracket with another match before.

- Bracket Stage

- Single Elimination.
- All bracket stage matches are best of five.
- The final game is Blind Pick while other games are Draft Pick
- Finals will hold in Nangang Exhibition Center, Taipei.

=== Participants ===
12 teams from 5 countries/areas

| Counties | Team(s) | ID |
|---|---|---|
| Taiwan | (Taiwan) Taipei Assassins | TPA |
| Taiwan | (Taiwan) Logitech G Fighter | AF |
| Taiwan | (Taiwan) ahq eSports Club | ahq |
| Taiwan | (Taiwan) Machi Esports | MCX |
| Vietnam | (Vietnam) Saigon Jokers | SAJ |
| Vietnam | (Vietnam) Saigon Fantastic Five | SF5 |
| Vietnam | (Vietnam) Full Louis | FL |
| Singapore | (Singapore) Insidious Rebirth | iSR |
| Singapore | (Singapore) Insidious Legends | iSL |
| Philippines | (Philippines) Imperium Pro Team | IPT |
| Philippines | (Philippines) Wargods | WG |
| Thailand | (Thailand) Bangkok Titans | BKT |

=== Results ===
==== Group stage ====
Group A

| # | Team | ~ | TPA | AF | SAJ | BKT | iSL | IPT | W | L | ± |
|---|---|---|---|---|---|---|---|---|---|---|---|
| 1 | (Taiwan) Taipei Assassins | TPA | ~ | 2−0 | 2−0 | 1−1 | 2−0 | 2−0 | 9 | 1 | +8 |
| 2 | (Taiwan) Logitech G Fighter | AF | 0−2 | ~ | 2−0 | 2−0 | 2−0 | 2−0 | 8 | 2 | +6 |
| 3 | (Vietnam) Saigon Joker | SAJ | 1−1 | 0−2 | ~ | 2−0 | 2−0 | 2−0 | 7 | 3 | +4 |
| 4 | (Thailand) Bangkok Titans | BKT | 0−2 | 0−2 | 0−2 | ~ | 1−1 | 2−0 | 3 | 7 | −4 |
| 5 | (Singapore) Insidious Gaming Legends | iSL | 0−2 | 0−2 | 0−2 | 1−1 | ~ | 1−1 | 2 | 8 | −6 |
| 6 | (Philippines) Imperium Pro Team | IPT | 0−2 | 0−2 | 0−2 | 0−2 | 1−1 | ~ | 1 | 9 | −8 |

Group B

| # | Team | ~ | ahq | SF5 | FL | iSR | MCX | WG | W | L | ± |
|---|---|---|---|---|---|---|---|---|---|---|---|
| 1 | (Taiwan) ahq eSports Club | ahq | ~ | 0−2 | 2−0 | 2−0 | 2−0 | 2−0 | 8 | 2 | +6 |
| 2 | (Vietnam) Saigon Fantastic 5 | SF5 | 2−0 | ~ | 1−1 | 1−1 | 1−1 | 2−0 | 7 | 3 | +4 |
| 3 | (Taiwan) Full Louis | FL | 0−2 | 1−1 | ~ | 2−0 | 2−0 | 1−1 | 6 | 4 | +2 |
| 4 | (Singapore) Insidious Gaming Rebirth | iSR | 0−2 | 1−1 | 0−2 | ~ | 0−2 | 2−0 | 3 | 7 | −4 |
| 5 | (Taiwan) Machi Esports | MCX | 0−2 | 1−1 | 0−2 | 2−0 | ~ | 0−2 | 3 | 7 | −4 |
| 6 | (Philippines) Wargods | WG | 0−2 | 0−2 | 1−1 | 2−0 | 0−2 | ~ | 3 | 7 | −4 |

- Tiebreakers

| # | Team | ~ | iSR | MCX | WG | W | L | ± |
|---|---|---|---|---|---|---|---|---|
| 1 | (Singapore) Insidious Gaming Rebirth | iSR | ~ | 1−0 | 1−0 | 2 | 0 | +2 |
| 2 | (Taiwan) Machi Esports | MCX | 0−1 | ~ | 1−0 | 1 | 1 | +0 |
| 3 | (Philippines) Wargods | WG | 0−1 | 0−1 | ~ | 0 | 2 | −2 |

==== Bracket Stage ====
- Eight teams are drawn into a best-of-five single elimination bracket.
- Teams of the same group can not play each other until the finals.
- All matches are best-of-five.

Quarter-finals
16 July
Taipei Assassins | 3
(Singapore) Insidious Rebirth | 0
18 July
Saigon Joker | 2
Saigon Fantastic 5 | 3
24 July
(Taiwan) Logitech G Fighter | 1
(Vietnam) Full Louis (Note: Full Louis got disqualified from GPL for using players under the age of 17 (SofM and Jeff). Logitech G Fighter replace them in the semifinals.) | 3
25 July
ahq eSports Club | 3
(Thailand) Bangkok Titans | 0

Semi-finals
30 July
Taipei Assassins | 3
Saigon Fantastic 5 | 1
6 August
(Taiwan) Logitech G Fighter | 1
ahq eSports Club | 3

Final
8 August
Taipei Assassins | 3
ahq eSports Club | 0
Third place match
16 August
Saigon Fantastic 5 | 1
(Taiwan) Logitech G Fighter | 3

=== Final standings ===
$200,000 US Dollars are spread among the teams as seen below:

| Place | Prize money | Circuit Points | Qualification | Team |
|---|---|---|---|---|
| 1st | $80,000 | 800 | 2014 World Championship | (Taiwan) Taipei Assassins |
| 2nd | $40,000 | 400 | | (Taiwan) ahq eSports Club |
| 3rd | $25,000 | 225 | | (Taiwan) Logitech G Fighter |
| 4th | $15,000 | 200 | | (Vietnam) Saigon Fantastic 5 |
| 5−7 | $8,000 | 140 | | (Vietnam) Saigon Jokers |
| 5−7 | $8,000 | 140 | | (Thailand) Bangkok Titans |
| 5−7 | $8,000 | 140 | | (Singapore) Insidious Rebirth |
| 8−9 | $3,000 | 80 | | (Singapore) Insidious Legends |
| 8−9 | $3,000 | 80 | | (Taiwan) Machi Esports |
| 10−11 | $1,000 | 40 | | (Philippines) Imperium Pro Team |
| 10−11 | $1,000 | 40 | | (Philippines) Wargods |
| DQ | | | | (Vietnam) Full Louis |

== Circuit points ==
The top 4 teams with the most Circuit Points at the end of the year will qualify for the 2014 Season Garena Regional Finals

- Two team slots have been allocated for Garena Regions in League of Legends Worlds 2014 .

- Champion of 2014 GPL Summer
- Champion of 2014 Regional Finals

| Seed | Team | Season | | | Total | Qualification |
| Seed | Team | Winter | Spring | Summer | Total | Qualification |
|---|---|---|---|---|---|---|
| 1 | (Taiwan) Taipei Assassins | 400 | 600 | 800 | 1800 | Worlds 2014 |
| 2 | (Taiwan) ahq eSports Club | 150 | 300 | 400 | 850 | 2014 Regional Finals |
| 3 | (Taiwan) Taipei Snipers | 200 | 225 | − | 425 | 2014 Regional Finals |
| 4 | (Vietnam) Saigon Jokers | 100 | 150 | 140 | 390 | 2014 Regional Finals |
| 5 | (Vietnam) Saigon Fantastic 5 | 40 | 105 | 200 | 345 | 2014 Regional Finals |
| 6 | (Taiwan) Logitech G Fighter | − | − | 300 | 300 | |
| 7 | (Thailand) Bangkok Titans | 20 | 60 | 140 | 220 | |
| 8 | (Singapore) Insidious Legends | − | 105 | 80 | 195 | |
| 9 | Singapore Sentinels | 70 | 105 | − | 185 | |
| 10 | (Singapore) Insidious Rebirth | − | − | 140 | 140 | |
| 11 | (Vietnam) Full Louis | 70 | 60 | 0 (Note: Full Louis were disqualified from GPL Summer due to using players who were not at least 17 years of age) | 130 | |
| 12 | (Taiwan) yoe Flash Wolves | − | 105 | − | 105 | |
| 13 | (Taiwan) Machi Esports | − | − | 80 | 80 | |
| 14 | (Hong Kong) HK Attitude | 70 | − | − | 70 | |
| 14 | (Philippines) Mineski | 70 | − | − | 70 | |
| 14 | (Philippines) Imperium Pro Team | − | 30 | 40 | 70 | |
| 17 | (Malaysia) KL Hunters | 40 | − | − | 40 | |
| 17 | (Philippines) Wargods | − | − | 40 | 40 | |
| 19 | (Philippines) Manila Eagles | − | 30 | − | 30 | |
| 20 | (Thailand) Team Infinite | 20 | − | − | 20 | |

== Regional Finals ==
=== Locations ===
- Round 1

- Aces Gaming Center, Ho Chi Minh City, Vietnam

- Round 2 and Final

- Garena Stadium, Singapore, Singapore

=== Format ===
- The 1st to 4th ranked teams without the winners of 2014 GPL Summer of GPL Circuit Points will qualify
- Single elimination tournament with seeding based on Challenger Circuit ranks
- All matches in the bracket are Best of Five and all games are Draft Pick
- All games will be played on Patch 4.13, with Sona disabled.

=== Participants ===
4 teams from 2 countries/areas

| Counties | Team(s) | ID |
|---|---|---|
| Taiwan | (Taiwan) Taipei Snipers | TPS |
| Taiwan | (Taiwan) ahq eSports Club | ahq |
| Vietnam | (Vietnam) Saigon Jokers | SAJ |
| Vietnam | (Vietnam) Saigon Fantastic Five | SF5 |

=== Results ===
- All matches are best-of-five.

Round 1 Ho Chi Minh City, Vietnam
August 19
Saigon Joker | 1
Saigon Fantastic 5 | 3

Round 2 Singapore
August 23
Taipei Snipers | 2
Saigon Fantastic 5 | 3
ahq eSports Club | W

Final; Singapore
August 24
ahq eSports Club | 3
Saigon Fantastic 5 | 0

=== Final standings ===
| Place | Team | Qualification |
|---|---|---|
| 1st | (Taiwan) ahq eSports Club | Worlds 2014 |
| 2nd | (Vietnam) Saigon Fantatic 5 | |
| 3rd | (Taiwan) Taipei Snipers | |
| 4th | (Vietnam) Saigon Jokers | |
