= 2014 Vietnam Championship Series A Summer Season =

Video game competition

2014 VCS A Summer
- 2014

Tournament information
- Sport: League of Legends
- Dates: 14 June–24 September
- Administrator: Garena Vietnam
- Host: Vietnam
- Teams: 8

Final positions
- Champions: Hanoi Fate
- Runner-up: Danang Elements

The 2014 Vietnam Championship Series A Summer Season is the third split of the first season of Vietnam's fully professional League of Legends, With the sponsorship of Dell, the tournament is known as Dell Championship Serie A.

== Format ==
- 8 teams participate
- Round robin matches. Each match is Best of Two.

- 1:1 Tie game both teams receive 1 point
- 2:0 Won team receives 3 points
- Top four teams advance to the playoffs.

- Playoffs

- Final is Best of Five
- All other matches are best of three

== Participants ==
Team(s)	ID
(Vietnam) Team Miracle	TM
(Vietnam) 269 Gaming	269
(Vietnam) Hanoi Dragons	HND
(Vietnam) Hanoi Phoenix	HNP
(Vietnam) Aces Gaming	ACE
(Vietnam) Hanoi Fate	HF
(Vietnam) Danang Elements	DNE
(Vietnam) Saigon XGame	XG

=== Rosters ===
Teams	Players				
Teams	Top	Jungle	Mid	ADC	Support
Team Miracle	(Vietnam) Cat	(Vietnam) Hihu (Vietnam) Junie	(Vietnam) TsLaw (Vietnam) Navy	(Vietnam) Benny (Vietnam) TTD	(Vietnam) Oc (Vietnam) Fayt
Hanoi Dragons	(Vietnam) KingOfWar (Vietnam) JetTrue	(Vietnam) Bibo (Vietnam) ProE	(Vietnam) Tentei	(Vietnam) Kai	(Vietnam) Babie
269 Gaming	(Vietnam) Crom	(Vietnam) Crys (Vietnam) Crych	(Vietnam) Beyond	(Vietnam) Augustus	(Vietnam) Ti
Hanoi Fate	(Vietnam) shAdy	(Vietnam) Jully (Vietnam) MeoU	(Vietnam) Jinky	(Vietnam) Lysna	(Vietnam) Slay (Vietnam) Akiho
Hanoi Phoenix	(Vietnam) Lolita	(Vietnam) Rain	(Vietnam) Henry	(Vietnam) Tartarus (Vietnam) Sena	(Vietnam) Miuky
Aces Gaming	(Vietnam) Casper	(Vietnam) Heaven	(Vietnam) ThoNe (Vietnam) Ren	(Vietnam) LieS (Vietnam) Hell (Vietnam) Syl	(Vietnam) Esolar (Vietnam) Kira
Saigon XGame	(Vietnam) Brian (Vietnam) Thang	(Vietnam) LawJ	(Vietnam) curot (Vietnam) Toy	(Vietnam) Prince	(Vietnam) YellowPack (Vietnam) BrB
Danang Elements	(Vietnam) Zafes	(Vietnam) Jinkey	(Vietnam) Auzeze	(Vietnam) Holmes (Vietnam) Destiny	(Vietnam) Row (Vietnam) Ryo

== Results ==
=== Group stage ===
#	Team	~	HF	DNE	HNP	269	TM	HND	XG	ACE	W	L	±
1	Hanoi Fate	HF	~	2−2	3−1	2−2	4−0	4−0	3−1	3−1	21	7	+14
2	Danang Elements	DNE	2−2	~	2−2	2−2	4−0	3−1	3−1	2−2	18	10	+8
3	Hanoi Phoenix	HNF	1−3	2−2	~	2−2	2−2	1−3	3−1	3−1	14	14	+0
4	269 Gaming	269	2−2	2−2	2−2	~	2−2	1−3	2−2	3−1	14	14	+0
5	Team Miracle	TM	0−4	0−4	2−2	2−2	~	3−1	2−2	3−1	12	16	−4
6	Hanoi Dragons	HND	0−4	1−3	3−1	3−1	1−3	~	2−2	3−1	13	15	−2
7	Saigon Xgame	XG	1−3	1−3	1−3	2−2	2−2	2−2	~	2−2	11	14	−3
8	Aces Gaming	ACE	1−3	2−2	1−3	2−2	1−3	1−3	2−2	~	10	18	−8

- 5th Place Tiebreaker Hanoi Dragon 0−1 Team Miracle

=== Playoffs ===
Semi-finals
Hanoi Fate	2
269 Gaming	0
Danang Elements	2
Hanoi Phoenix	1

Finals
Hanoi Fate	3
Danang Elements	2
3rd-place match
269 Gaming	1
Hanoi Phoenix	2

== Final standings ==
₫ 300,000,000 Vietnamese Dong are spread among the teams as seen below:

Place	Prize	Team
1st	₫100,000,000	Hanoi Fate
2nd	₫60,000,000	Danang Elements
3rd	₫40,000,000	Hanoi Phoenix
4th	₫30,000,000	269 Gaming
5th	₫25,000,000	Team Miracle
6th	₫20,000,000	Hanoi Dragons
7th	₫15,000,000	Saigon Xgame
8th	₫10,000,000	Aces Gaming
