= 2012 GPL season =

GPL 2012 Season 1
- 2012

Tournament information
- Sport: League of Legends
- Dates: 18 May 2012–11 November 2012
- Administrator: Riot Games
- Host: Singapore
- Teams: 6

Final positions
- Champions: (Taiwan) Taipei Assassins
- Runner-up: Singapore Sentinels

The GPL 2012 Season 1 was Asia's first regional and fully professional League of Legends league.

== Format ==
- 20 week season
- Round robin matches
- Each match is best of one
- First place team advances to the finals
- Second and third place teams advances to the semifinals

== Participants ==
6 teams from 6 countries/areas

Counties	Team(s)	ID
Vietnam	(Vietnam) Saigon Jokers	SAJ
Philippines	(Philippines) Manila Eagles	ME
Malaysia	(Malaysia) KL Hunters	KLH
Singapore	Singapore Sentinels	SGS
Thailand	(Thailand) Bangkok Titans	BKT
Taiwan	(Taiwan) Taipei Assassins	TPA

== Results ==
=== Group stage ===
#	Team	~	TPA	SGS	SAJ	KLH	ME	BKT	W	L	±
1	(Taiwan) Taipei Assassins	TPA	~	7−1	8−0	8−0	7−1	8−0	38	2	+36
2	Singapore Sentinels	SGS	1−7	~	8−0	5−3	8−0	7−1	29	11	+18
3	(Vietnam) Saigon Joker	SAJ	0−8	0−8	~	7−1	6−2	8−0	21	19	+2
4	(Malaysia) KL Hunters	KLH	0−8	3−5	1−7	~	5−3	7−1	16	22	−4
5	(Philippines) Manila Eagles	ME	1−7	0−8	2−6	3−5	~	6−2	12	28	−16
6	(Thailand) Bangkok Titans	BKT	0−8	1−7	0−8	1−7	2−6	~	4	34	−30

== Playoffs ==
- The second and third place teams from the round robin will face off in a single-elimination Bo3 Semifinal.
- The winner of Semifinal will face the first place team from the round robin in a single-elimination Bo5 Grand Final.

=== Results ===
Semi-finals
Singapore Sentinels	2
(Vietnam) Saigon Jokers	0
(Taiwan) Taipei Assassins	W

Finals
(Taiwan) Taipei Assassins	3
Singapore Sentinels	1

== Final standings ==
Place	Team	Prize money
1st	(Taiwan) Taipei Assassins	$10,000
2nd	Singapore Sentinels	$7,000
3rd	(Vietnam) Saigon Jokers	$6,500
4th	(Malaysia) KL Hunters	$6,000
5th	(Philippines) Manila Eagles	$5,500
6th	(Thailand) Bangkok Titans	$5,000
