= Taipei Assassins =

Taiwanese League of Legends team

- Short name: TPA
- Game: League of Legends
- Founded: 9 March 2012
- Folded: 19 April 2016
- League: Garena Premier League (2012–2014); League of Legends Master Series (2015–2016)
- Based in: Taipei
- Arena: Garena E-Sports Stadium
- Colors: Red and black
- Owner: Liu "Retty" Chia-Chu
- Championships: Season 2 World Championship (2012)
- Partners: Azubu

Chinese name
- Traditional Chinese: 台北暗殺星
- Simplified Chinese: 台北暗杀星
Transcriptions
Standard Mandarin
- Hanyu Pinyin: Táiběi Ànshāxīng

Taipei Assassins (TPA) (Note: In local languages: Traditional Chinese script: 台北暗殺星; Mandarin Pinyin: Táiběi Ànshāxīng) was a Taiwanese professional League of Legends team. It competed in the Garena Premier League (GPL) and later the League of Legends Master Series. It won the Season 2 World Championship in 2012. From 2013 to 2014, the team was known as "Azubu Taipei Assassins" due to its sponsorship by streaming website Azubu. Taipei Assassins was the sister team of Taipei Snipers, another GPL team.

== Founding ==
Support player "MiSTakE" met top laner "Stanley" while playing in the League of Legends. Shortly after connecting, their mutual friend "colalin" introduced them to "NeXAbc" and former Counter Logic Gaming player "Lilballz". Together with mid laner "A8000", they formed their team, For The Win (FTW), with MiSTakE as team captain.

FTW's first event was Garena's G1 esports competition. At the tournament, FTW took first place ahead of 150 other teams to qualify for the 2011 World Cyber Games. At the 2011 World Cyber Games, FTW could not make it through the group stage as they finished third in their group with a 2–2 record. FTW defeated Team Jantelaget and Orange eSports and lost to NaJin e-mFire and Millenium. Mid laner A8000 left the team after the event.

Despite being eliminated early on in the 2011 World Cyber Games, video game developer Garena took notice of the team's strong performance and offered to become the team's official sponsor. On 9 March 2012, Garena acquired FTW's roster and rebranded them as the Taipei Assassins.

== 2012 ==
Approximately one month after their official sponsorship began with Garena, Taipei Assassins underwent several roster changes. The team first welcomed AD carry "bebeisadog" and mid laner "Toyz". Support player colalin and mid laner NeXAbc then moved to substitute positions. Team captain MiSTakE also transitioned from AD carry to support.

On 15 July 2012, Taipei Assassins took first place at the IGN ProLeague Season 5 Taiwanese Qualifiers. In the group stage, Taipei Assassins finished first, going 3–0 by defeating AllLaneCarry, TimeToTerminate, and HaNa. In the offline playoffs of the qualifiers, Taipei Assassins went undefeated, taking out WhyTrollMe 2–0 in the semifinals and Corsair 2–0 in the grand finals to take first place.

Taipei Assassins competed in the Season Two Regionals in Taipei. In the Round of 32 group stage, Taipei Assassins took first place in their group, going 3–0 by defeating 301英雄聯盟, TeamMarlboroClassicS, and TheCradleOfVictory. Advancing to the Round-of-8 group stage, Taipei Assassins once again went undefeated, going 3–0 and taking first in their group, defeating AllLaneCarry, 皮卡丘打毛線, and TheoryOfEvolution. In the playoffs, Taipei Assassins took out MksZ 2–0 in the semifinals and then played a show match with the visiting CLG EU, which they lost. The Assassins continued their streak and defeated Corsair 2–0 in the grand finals, qualifying for the Season 2 World Championship in Los Angeles.

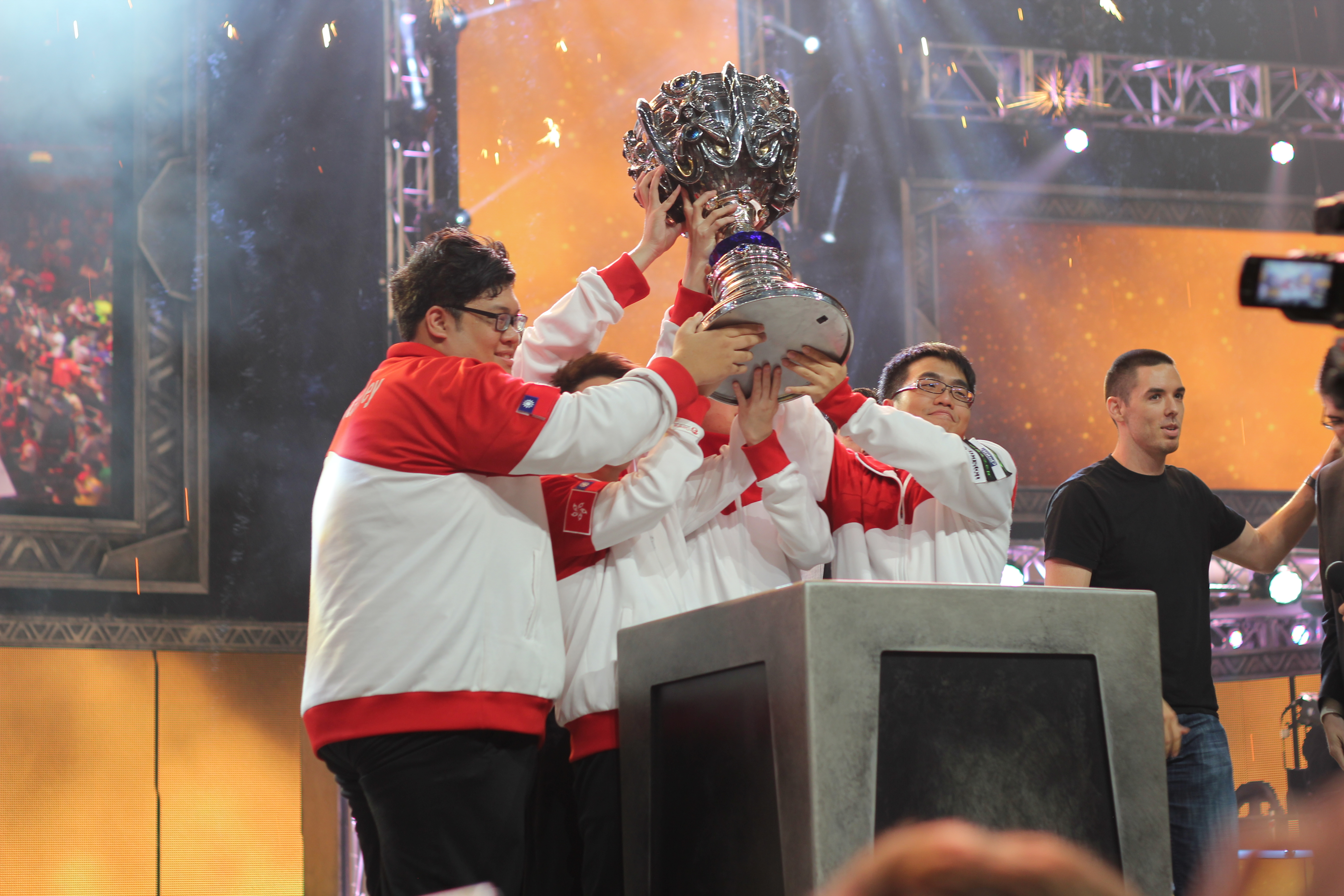
Taipei Assassins at the Season 2 World Championship

Taipei Assassins participated in the Season 2 World Championship held from 4 to 13 October 2012 in Los Angeles. Of the five regional champions, four teams, including TPA, were given a free pass out of the group stage based on a random drawing. In the quarterfinals, TPA faced off against the Korean team NaJin Sword. Despite being underdogs after NaJin Sword's strong group stage showing, the Assassins were able to come out with a victory, winning both games dominantly. They advanced to the semifinals against heavy tournament favorites Moscow Five. Alex Ich's Evelynn play caught TPA off guard in the first contest and put Moscow Five one game up in the series, but TPA rallied and took the next two games to win, earning a spot in the grand finals opposite Azubu Frost. The Assassins once again dropped the first game in the set, but Frost folded under TPA's stellar coordination and relentless pressure throughout the next three games. TPA beat the Korean squad three games to one, securing the championship title and taking home the one million dollar grand prize. Riot later released a set of TPA-themed skins for each of the champions they played in Game Four of the Finals.

Shortly after the conclusion of Season 2, TPA announced the addition of two more players onto their roster. "Zonda" was brought in as a substitute for top lane while GoDJJ joined as a second AD player; the changes suggested the formation of a second squad under the organization in the near future.

Taipei Assassins attended the 2012 GPL Season 1 playoffs on 17 November in Singapore. They were seeded directly into the finals of the three-team tournament, being the number one seed holding a 38–2 record throughout the regular season. The Singapore Sentinels managed to defeat Saigon Jokers in the semi-finals, setting the stage for a showdown between the two strongest teams in the GPL. TPA managed to take the first two games without much trouble, with Stanley constantly split pushing and outmaneuvering the opposition. SGS pulled out an interesting shield strategy in Game 3, with "Chawy" on "Karma" in mid lane. The strategy caught TPA off guard, and SGS managed to end the game in a rout of the Taiwanese squad. The Sentinels attempted a similar strategy in Game 4, again acquiring a large advantage early game. However, Toyz turned the tide of the game with a spot-on Orianna ultimate during a close Dragon fight, which decimated SGS and their chances at the title. In the end, Taipei Assassins secured 1st place at the event, going 3–1 and taking home the championship ring.

On 29 November and 2 December, the Assassins competed in IPL 5 in Las Vegas. During the group stages, TPA defeated Thai hopefuls Blackbean, giving "BeBe" one of the three pentakills in the tournament. Later TPA went against Moscow 5 in a rematch of the Season 2 World Championship semi-finals. Stanley on Rengar ran rampant on the Russian squad, advancing the Assassins 2–0 into the playoffs. TPA faced a massive upset in Round 2 against FnaticRC, falling 0–2 into the losers bracket. There the Taiwanese team would sweep two series against the Singapore Sentinels and Curse Gaming. Coming into Round 4, the Assassins faced CLG EU. The Europeans won a fast-paced opener and held a clear advantage throughout most of the second game. However, after Bebe finished his core build on Caitlyn, TPA managed to take a team fight and the game. In the third game, the Assassins again prevailed in a long drawn out game, eliminating CLG EU from the IPL 5. TPA then defeated M5 2–0, making it their fifth consecutive win against the Russian team. In the semifinals TPA was once again outmaneuvered and overrun by FnaticRC, falling 0–2. Taipei Assassins took 3rd place at the event with $7,500 in winnings.

== 2013 ==
After winning 2012's GPL, TPA was invited to the 2013 Spring and Summer split of the GPL. On 10 January, TPA was invited to participate in the GIGABYTE StarsWar League Season 2. TPA had a good performance in the group stage, going 3–1–1, winning against Positive Energy, LGD Gaming, and Royal Club Huang Zu, while tying against Najin Sword and losing to MVP Ozone. However, they showed a disappointing 2–0 loss against Chinese powerhouse Team WE, and a surprising loss to amateur team Positive Energy, especially after their 2–0 victory against them in the group stage. This unfortunate outcome was directly linked by many people to Lilballz's inability to adapt to the Season 3 jungle meta. TPA eventually finished the Spring Split of the GPL 27–1, losing only 1 game to SGS, which people again linked directly to Lilballz.

On 18 May, TPA was invited to play in the NVIDIA Game Festival 2013. As a result of TPA losing 1–0 to Royal Club Huang Zu, TPA decided to start tryouts for new positions for their jungler (to replace Lilballz), although the decision was somewhat indecisive. TPA would, however, pull out a surprising 2–1 victory against OMG, one of the strongest Chinese teams, showing that TPA was still a strong team, despite a recent slump. This eventually led to the decision that Lilballz was to be replaced by their new jungler Sarsky. Since IPL 5, TPA was in the doldrums. Therefore, the team desired to win tournaments, so much pressure was made and led to the team playing under a bad atmosphere.

After TPA showing some bad results against teams in the 2013 GPL Summer, Garena announced that Stanley was released from TPA and Toyz retired from competitive League of Legends on 30 June 2013. At the same time, Jay and Achie join TPA to solve the roster vacancy.

TPA lost the chance to go to the Season 3 World Championship after they lost 0–2 vs. Gamania Bears in the lower bracket of the S3 Taipei Qualifiers. They ended their bad season 3 with a loss against ahq in the 2013 GPL Championship.

== 2014 ==
In the beginning of Season 4, TPA acquired "Morning" from Wayi Spider as the new mid laner; while "BeBe" switched back to AD Carry and "DinTer" became the substitute. On 11 October, Lilballz got a ban from Garena since he is caught from elo-boosting and retired right after the ban is active. From November 2013 to January 2014, TPA competed in the 2014 GPL Winter. They finished the group stage with 8 wins and 2 losses. They managed to beat Full Louis (3–0), Saigon Jokers (3–2), and Taipei Snipers (3–2) in the knockout stages and became the champion of the tournament. During the time of 2014 GPL Winter, TPA also took part in IEM Season VIII – Singapore, but lost to Saigon Jokers and got the 5th/6th place along with Singapore Sentinels.

Right after the 2014 GPL Winter, "Sarsky" left TPA. DinTer became the starting jungler and the team played in 2014 GPL Spring. They won all their matches in the group stage. In the knock out stages, TPA defeated Insidious Gaming (3–0), Taipei Snipers (3–2), and ahq (3–2) to become the champion of the tournament once again. TPA was also invited to IEM Season VIII - World Championship but got only the 5th/6th place along with Invictus Gaming.

TPA then acquired Winds from Taipei Snipers as the new jungler. They came to All-Star Paris 2014 as Taiwan & SEA representative but they got a bad tournament with 4 losses against Cloud 9, Fnatic, SK Telecom T1 K, and OMG. Before the 2014 GPL Summer started, TPA acquired Chawy from Singapore Sentinels as the substitute mid laner. They finished the group stage with 9 wins and 1 loss. TPA then managed to win against Insidious Gaming Rebirth (3–0); Saigon Fantastic Five (3–1); and ahq (3–0) to become the champion of the tournament the third time, getting the #1 seed of Taiwan & SEA Region in the World Championship 2014.

== 2016 ==
Taiwanese singer Jay Chou announced on 19 April 2016 that he had acquired the LMS spot of Taipei Assassins for his new esports organization, J Team. Taipei Assassins disbanded that same day.

== Notes ==
Awards and achievements
Preceded by Fnatic	League of Legends World Championship winner 2012	Succeeded by SK Telecom T1
Preceded by New championship ahq e-Sports Club	Garena Premier League winner Season 1 2012 – Spring 2013; Winter 2014 – Summer 2014	Succeeded by ahq e-Sports Club; Saigon Fantastic Five
