= Mineski =

Filipino esports team

- Divisions: Esports
- Founded: February 14, 2004; 22 years ago
- Based in: San Juan, Metro Manila, Philippines
- Location: Southeast Asia
- Owner: Mineski Global (from 2009)
- Head coach: Yap "Kenchi" Chee Loong
- Manager: Zak "DashOCE" Holman
- Partners: AirAsia; Sennheiser; VKGame
- Website: esports.mineski.net

Mineski is an inactive esports team established on February 14, 2004 in the Philippines. They had a Dota 2 team and a professional League of Legends team.

== History ==
Mineski was established as a DOTA esports team on February 14, 2004, by Filipino gamer Ronald Robins and his teammates in Manila, Philippines. The team competed in various domestic and international competitions including the World Cyber Games. In December 2009, shortly after Robins retired, Robins and his former teammates went on to establish Mineski company (which would become known as Mineski Global) to run an internet cafe chain primarily catering to gamers. It also started from organizing localized esports competitions hosted in its internet cafes to holding international esports tournaments.

In 2011, Mineski was invited by Valve to compete with fifteen other teams in the first ever The International. Mineski expanded out of the Philippines in 2012, when it acquired a South Korean Dota roster. The team is no longer active.

Mineski qualified for the 2015 Frankfurt Major by winning the Southeast Asia qualifier tournament. Mineski won the Philippine Qualifier for ESL One Manila in 2016. Mineski also won the SEA Qualifier for the Manila Majors.

In 2017, Mineski came close to winning the first tournament of the DPC 2017-2018 Season by achieving second place in the third season of the StarLadder i-League Invitational, they went on to win the next tournament, PGL Open Bucharest. In 2018, Mineski won their first major tournament, Dota 2 Asia Championships 2018, with this achievement they also became the first team from the Southeast Asia region to win a major tournament. With this win, they secured enough DPC points to secure their slot for The International 2018, though they finished in 9-12th place as well as The International 2019. With no major achievements in DPC 2018-2019 Season, the team disbanded.

=== Roster ===
As of May 19, 2020, Mineski have no active Dota 2 roster.

=== Achievements ===
Sources: Mineski's Facebook page, GosuGamers, and Yahoo Esports

2013 achievements

Placement	Competition
	Netolic Pro League Online September
	GEST Dota2 August
	Neolution GosuCup August
	Gigabyte Mineski Pro-Gaming League 5-8 Dota2 (LAN)
	GEST Dota2 July
	Gigabyte Mineski Pro-Gaming League 5-7 Dota2 (LAN)
	Neolution GosuCup June
	Gigabyte Mineski Pro-Gaming League 5-6 Dota2 (LAN)
	E2Max L33t Championship PH Qualifier
	Gigabyte Mineski Pro-Gaming League 5-5 Dota2 (LAN)
	TNC Cup Dota2
	BluDOTA OGM Dota2 SEA Open
	Gigabyte Mineski Pro-Gaming League 5-4 Dota2 (LAN)
	Tide's Wrath Online Dota2 Tournament
	TheNet.Com Dota2 Tournament Online
	Gigabyte Mineski Pro-Gaming League 5-3 Dota2 (LAN)
	Ledion Mini tournament Dota2
	MSI Revolution Dota2 (LAN)
	Gigabyte Mineski Pro-Gaming League 5-2 Dota2 (LAN)

2012 achievements

Placement	Competition
	Power Cup Dota2 Tournament
	SMM 2012 Malaysia
	Gigabyte GEST DotA Cup November (Online)
	GPPC Dota2 Tournament November
	Gigabyte GEST DotA Cup August (Online)
	Davao Cyber Expo
	MIOT Legarda Dota2
	Alodia's Birthday Bash Dota1
	Gigabyte Mineski Pro-Gaming League 4-3 DotA (LAN)
	Ledion Dota Tournament: Big Dog J Birthday Celebration (LAN)
	Razer Dota 2 Tournament Singapore
	Gigabyte GEST DotA Cup February (Online)
	Gigabyte Mineski Pro-Gaming League 4-1 DotA (LAN)
	Pacific Dota Tournament Philippines, January (LAN)
	Thailand Game Show (LAN)- DotA

2011 achievements

Placement	Competition
	Asian Cyber Games Dota 2 Malaysia Invitational
	Sendi Mutiara Multimedia Grand Final
	PCXpress Gaming Expo
	WCG Asian Championship Dota 2
	WCG Asian Championship WC3 Dota
	Mineski Pro-Gaming League Grand Final
	TheGamesXpo (TGX) Singapore
	Mineski Pro-Gaming League 3-9
	Mineski Pro-Gaming League 3-8
10th	The International
	Mineski Pro-Gaming League 3-7 (TGX PH Qualifiers)
	Mineski Pro-Gaming League 3-6
	Mineski Pro-Gaming League 3-6
	Mineski Pro-Gaming League 3-4
	D-Six Dota Tournament
	Mineski Pro-Gaming League 3-3
	Mineski Pro-Gaming League 3-2
	Mineski Pro-Gaming League 3-1

2010 achievements

Placement	Competition
10th	Sendi Mutiara Multimedia Grand Final
	Gamepod DotA Tournament
	Pacific 2nd Battle of the Champions Tournament
	Alienware Mineski Pro-Gaming League 2-5
	Alienware Mineski Pro-Gaming League 2-4
	Alienware Mineski Pro-Gaming League 2-3
	Pacific 1st Battle of the Champions Tournament
	Alienware Mineski Pro-Gaming League 2-1
	Alienware Mineski Pro-Gaming League 1-5
	Alienware Mineski Pro-Gaming League 1-3
	Cubizone DotA Tournament

2009 achievements

Placement	Competition
10th	Sendi Mutiara Multimedia (SMM) Grand Final
	Mineski Dota Tournament 4 (MSDT-4)
	Mineski Dota Tournament 3 (MSDT-3)
	Mineski Dota Tournament 2 (MSDT-2)
	Mineski Dota Tournament 2 (MSDT-1)
	PSW4 Dota Tournament
	Paradigm DotaPH EyeBall
	New England College Dota Tourney (NEC)
	Batlle of the Kriss 3
	World GameMasters Tournament Philippines

2008 achievements

Place	Competition
	ASUS WGT 2008 DOTA
	Battle of the Kriss 2
	SKOTH2
Participant	ASIAN CYBERGAMES SG PH Representatives
Participant	Asian Dota Championships 2008 Philippine Team
	WCG DotA Philippines
	Cyberzone Cyber Games
	Battle of the Kriss
	Pdip 2008
	Wired Lounge Tournament
	Aenigma
4th	Asian Dota Championships
	Philippine Regional War

2005–2007 achievements

Placement	Competition
	Asian Dota Championships Philippines
	DLST 5
	Paradigm TSEI Warm Up Tourney
	I-hooked Tournament
	Digital Affinity Tournament
	Super Tournament
	Y2k Tournament
	Eaglepoint Tournament
	E.G.G. Market! Market!
	Tribu ni Misu Tournament
	Katips DotA Tournament
	1st La Salle DotA Tournament
