= GAM Esports =

Vietnamese League of Legends team

- Short name: GAM
- Games: Arena of Valor; League of Legends; Valorant
- Founded: May 2014
- Location: Vietnam
- Owner: Randy Dobson; Anthony "TK" Nguyễn
- Head coach: Trần "Archie" Minh Nhựt
- Manager: Tô "Fakie" Đông Pha
- Partners: LG Corporation; Logitech; Monster Energy; LEEP App; Phong Vũ Computer
- Parent group: GAM Entertainment
- Website: gam.gg

GAM Esports (Note: Formerly known as: Team Miracle (May 2014 – 15 October 2014); Boba Marines (15 October 2014 – 14 October 2016); GIGABYTE Marines (14 October 2016 – 14 June 2018)) is a Vietnamese professional esports organization. Their League of Legends team competes as a partnered team in the League of Legends Championship Pacific (LCP), the highest level of competitive League of Legends in the Asia-Pacific region. During their time in the Vietnam Championship Series (VCS), GAM was the dominant team in Vietnam. The team first rose to international prominence in 2017, after their exceptional performance at that year's Mid-Season Invitational (MSI). GAM also operate a team in Arena of Valor that competes in the Arena of Glory (AOG) league, the top league for Arena of Valor in Vietnam.

== History ==
=== 2014 ===
The team was founded in May 2014 after companies Tt Esports and Boba Net began a sponsorship with Team Miracle, which renamed to the Boba Marines five months later. During the 2014 VCS Summer Split, the team played as Tt Miracle Boba and finished the split in eight place with a 3–4 record. However, they were able to avoid relegation after the addition of former Saigon Jokers support and World Championship participant Junie.

=== 2015 ===
For the 2015 season, Archie, GoNy, and QTV rejoined their former teammates after leaving the Saigon Jokers, and the team renamed to the Boba Marines. The Marines failed to qualify for the spring split of the 2015 Garena Pro League (GPL), but did qualify for the summer split after finishing third in the 2015 VCS Spring Split. During the mid-season, the Marines replaced their mid laner Navy with Optimus from Saigon Fantastic Five. Despite showing improvement and winning the 2015 VCS Summer Split, the Marines were unable to win the 2015 GPL Summer Split.

=== 2016 ===
In 2016, the Marines finished third in the 2016 VCS Spring Split and fourth in the 2016 Mountain Dew Championship Series Summer Split (MDCS; i.e. VCS). The GPL also changed their qualification guidelines so that only champions of regional SEA tournaments could participate, meaning the Marines were unable to participate in GPL 2016.

=== 2017 ===
Before the 2017 season, the Marines' management made the decision to release their entire roster excluding Optimus and Archie. Afterwards, star players Ren, Levi, Slay, and Sergh joined the Marines as top, jungle, AD carry, and substitute support respectively. Tinikun also joined as head coach. The team received new sponsors, Gigabyte Technology and Adonis Icyber Gaming, and renamed to Marine Esports. As the GIGABYTE Marines, the team won the 2017 MDCS Spring Split and the 2017 GPL Spring Split without losing a single game, qualifying them for the 2017 Mid-Season Invitational (MSI).

At MSI 2017, the Marines finished the first round of the play-in group stage with a 5–1 record, only losing to Virtus.pro. In the second round, the Marines won the first two games of a best-of-five against Team SoloMid, before being reverse swept and losing 2–3. In the third and last qualifying round, the Marines beat SuperMassive eSports 3–1 to secure a spot in the main event. At the main event of MSI 2017 the Marines finished last in sixth place, with a 3–7 record. Despite their placement, the Marines' performance secured Vietnam a guaranteed group stage seed at the 2017 World Championships and an additional spot in the GPL.

The Marines were placed in Group B at the 2017 Worlds Championships, where they initially tied for second with Fnatic and Immortals, but had the highest seed going into the tiebreaker matches due to them having the shortest combined victory time. However, the Marines lost their tiebreaker match to Fnatic and did not advance to the knockout stage.

Shortly after the 2017 World Championships, Slay and Stark both announced they would be leaving the team. Optimus left the team post-season on 16 October 2017 and Levi joined American academy team 100 Thieves on 26 December 2017.

=== 2018 ===
The Marines finished third in the 2018 VCS Spring Split group stage with 9 wins and 5 losses, qualifying for playoffs, where they defeated Young Generation 3–1 in the quarterfinals and UTM Esports 3–1 in the semifinals. The Marines then played in the finals against EVOS Esports, narrowly losing to them 2–3.

On 14 June 2018, the team officially renamed to GAM Esports due to sponsorship changes. GAM then placed fifth in the 2018 VCS Summer Split with 8 wins and 6 losses.

=== 2019 ===
In spring 2019, GAM Esports missed out on playoffs for the second time, finishing in fifth place with 6 wins and 8 losses. Levi rejoined the team from JD Gaming on 14 May 2019 for the 2019 VCS Summer Split. The Marines ended the summer group stage in first place with an 11–3 record, qualifying for playoffs once again. In the semifinals they swept Lowkey Esports 3–0, moving on to face Team Flash in the grand finals, who they beat in a 3-0 fashion. GAM Esports qualified for the 2019 World Championship, where they were placed in group B alongside FunPlus Phoenix, J Team, and Splyce. They finished last in their group with 1 win and 5 losses.

=== 2020 ===
GAM Esports went through various changes in 2020, signing Dia1, Easylove, and Palette while releasing Zeros and Zin. The team placed first in the 2020 VCS Spring regular season with 13 wins and 1 loss, but placed second in playoffs following a 2-3 loss against Team Flash. Due to the ongoing COVID-19 pandemic, Riot Games organised the 2020 Mid-Season Showdown featuring the top 2 PCS and top 2 VCS teams to replace the annual Mid-Season Invitational. GAM Esports finished fourth, securing a single win against Team Flash.

In summer 2020, GAM Esports once again finished first in the regular season, securing 12 wins and 2 losses. During playoffs, GAM Esports lost against Team Flash twice to place second in the event. Despite securing a spot at the 2020 World Championship, GAM Esports and Team Flash could not attend the event due to the pandemic. It was later announced that both teams would still receive 2.1 percent of the prize-pool.

=== 2026 ===
In October 2026, GAM became one of the eight partner teams in the Valorant Champions Tour for the Pacific region starting from the 2027 season.

== Current roster ==
GAM Esports roster
Players
Coaches

Handle	Name	Nationality
Top	Kiaya	Trần Duy Sang	Vietnam
Mid	Aress	Hồ Văn Vĩ Đại	Vietnam
Jungle	Draktharr	Lê Ngọc Toàn	Vietnam
Bot	Artemis	Trần Quốc Hưng	Vietnam
Support	Taki	Đinh Anh Tài	Vietnam

Head coach

(Vietnam) Trần "Hype" Hữu Toàn

Legend:
- (I) Inactive
- (S) Suspended
- Substitute
- (injured) Injury / Illness

Roster updated ngày 09 tháng 11, 2025.

== Tournament results ==
Placement	Event	Final result (W–L)
1st	VCS A 2017 Spring	12–0
1st	VCS A 2017 Spring Playoffs	3–0 (against Young Generation)
1st	GPL 2017 Spring	3–0 (against (Thailand) Ascension Gaming)
6th	2017 Mid-Season Invitational	3–7 (main event)
2nd	Rift Rivals 2017 GPL-LJL-OPL	1–3 (against (Japan) LJL)
1st	VCS A 2017 Summer	13–1
1st	VCS A 2017 Summer Playoffs	3–0 (against Young Generation)
1st	GPL 2017 Summer	3–0 (against (Thailand) Ascension Gaming)
9th–11th	2017 World Championship	2–4 (main event)
3rd	VCS 2018 Spring	9–5
2nd	VCS 2018 Spring Playoffs	2–3 (against EVOS Esports)
3rd	Rift Rivals 2018 LCL-TCL-VCS	1–3 (against (Turkey) TCL)
5th	VCS 2018 Summer	8–6
5th	VCS 2019 Spring	6–8
1st	VCS 2019 Summer	11–3
1st	VCS 2020 Spring	13–1
2nd	VCS 2020 Spring Playoffs	2-3 (against Team Flash)
1st	VCS 2020 Summer	12–2
2nd	VCS 2020 Summer Playoffs	2–3 (against Team Flash)
2nd	VCS 2021 Winter	11–3
2nd	VCS 2022 Spring Playoffs	2–3 (against CERBERUS Esports)
1st	31st SEA Games, Vietnam qualifier	3–1 (against Saigon Buffalo)
1st	31st SEA Games (as Vietnam)	3–0 (against the Philippines)
1st	VCS 2022 Spring	14–0
1st	VCS 2022 Spring Playoffs	3–1 (against Saigon Buffalo)
1st	VCS 2022 Summer	11-3
1st	VCS 2022 Summer Playoffs	3–0 (against Saigon Buffalo)
14th–16th	2022 World Championship	1–5 (main event)
1st	VCS 2023 Dawn	14-0
1st	VCS 2023 Dawn Playoffs	3–1 (against SBTC Esports)
12th–13th	MSI 2023	1–2 (against (Mexico) Movistar R7)
1st	VCS 2023 Dusk	11–3
1st	VCS 2023 Dusk Playoffs	3–1 (against Team Whales)
12th–14th	Worlds 2023	0–2 (against (South Korea) Dplus KIA)
2nd	VCS 2024 Spring	9–3
1st	VCS 2024 Spring Playoffs	3–0 (against Vikings Esports)
9th–10th	MSI 2024	0–2 (against (Europe) Fnatic)
2nd	VCS 2024 Summer	10–2
1st	VCS 2024 Summer Playoffs	3–1 (against Vikings Esports)
12th–14th	Worlds 2024	1–2 (against (United States) Team Liquid)
5th	LCP 2025 Season Kickoff	3–4
4th	LCP 2025 Season Kickoff Qualifying Series	1–2 (against (Taiwan) Talon)
4th	LCP 2025 Mid Season	4–3
2nd	LCP 2025 Mid Season Qualifying Series	2–3 (against (Taiwan) CTBC Flying Oyster)
9th	MSI 2025	2–3 (against (Europe) G2 Esports)
11th–12th	Esports World Cup 2025	0–2 (against (Taiwan) CTBC Flying Oyster)
2nd	LCP 2025 Season Finals	2–0 (against (Vietnam) Team Secret Whales)
4th	LCP 2025 Season Finals Playoffs	0–3 (against (Vietnam) Team Secret Whales)
