= 2020 PCS season =

- League: Pacific Championship Series
- Sport: League of Legends
- Duration: 29 February – 3 May (Spring); 20 June – 30 August (Summer)
- Teams: 10

Spring
- Season champions: Talon Esports
- Runners-up: Machi Esports

Summer
- Season champions: Machi Esports
- Runners-up: PSG Talon

PCS seasons
- 2021 →

The 2020 PCS season was the first year of the Pacific Championship Series (PCS), a professional esports league for the MOBA PC game League of Legends. The PCS was created in late 2019 as a merger between the League of Legends Master Series (LMS) and League of Legends SEA Tour (LST).

The spring regular season was initially set to begin on 8 February but was postponed until further notice on 29 January due to the global COVID-19 pandemic. It was later announced on 18 February that the 2020 season would officially begin on 29 February.

The spring split began with the first day of the spring regular season on 29 February and concluded with the spring finals on 3 May. The summer split began with the first day of the summer regular season on 20 June and concluded with the summer finals on 30 August.

Talon Esports was the PCS' representative at the 2020 Mid-Season Showdown. Machi Esports and PSG Talon were the PCS' first and second seeds, respectively, at the 2020 World Championship.

== Spring ==
=== Teams and rosters ===
G-Rex was originally announced as one of the PCS' ten franchise partners, but on 25 September 2019 it was announced that the team had disbanded and forfeited its spot in the PCS as a result of internal restructuring by their parent company Emperor Esports Stars. Five days later, Machi Esports was announced as G-Rex's replacement.

Teams	Players					Coach
Teams	Top	Jungle	Mid	Bot	Support	Coach
ahq eSports Club	Ziv	Kongyue	Uniboy	Wako	Ysera	GreenTea
Alpha Esports	Rock	CatJug	Assassin	Atlen	Kino	Radiance
J Team	Rest	Hana	Nestea	Lilv	Woody	Coldicee
Machi Esports	PK	Gemini	M1ssion	Bruce	Koala	Dreamer
Hong Kong Attitude	3z	Holo; Kabuu	Chase; JimieN	MnM	Wing	Skywalk
Talon Esports	Hanabi	River	Candy	Unified	Kaiwing	Bigfafa
Berjaya Dragons	Azhi	Enso	Maoan; Minji	K2	Chilly	Paul
Liyab Esports	Kaigu (South Korea) Kurd	DoeDoii	Rex	Exosen	Hamez	Cabbage
Nova Esports	Rockky	Ryan	G4	MixcrosS	PoP	Warlock
Resurgence	Shinsekai	Epic; Gengar	Raven	Mexi	Dennis; Do1u1u	Crowe
Source: LoL Esports

=== Regular season standings ===
- Format: Double round robin, best-of-one

Pos	Team	W	L	Pts	Qualification
1	Machi Esports	15	3	12	Advance to winners' bracket second round
2	ahq eSports Club	14	4	10	Advance to winners' bracket second round
3	Talon Esports	13	5	8	Start in winners' bracket
4	Berjaya Dragons	10	8	2	Start in winners' bracket
5	Alpha Esports	8	10	−2	Start in winners' bracket
6	Nova Esports	7	11	−4	Start in winners' bracket
7	J Team (Note: Hong Kong Attitude, J Team, and Liyab Esports were in a three-way-tie for seventh place at the end of the regular season. Because all three teams had a tied head-to-head record (1–1) with the other two, placement in the subsequent tiebreaker matches was determined by the combined game time of each team's wins. J Team was awarded a bye to the second match for having the shortest total, and auto-qualified for playoffs.)	6	12	−6	Start in losers' bracket
8	Hong Kong Attitude	6	12	−6	Start in losers' bracket
9	Liyab Esports	6	12	−6	
10	Resurgence	5	13	−8	

Notes:

Seventh place tiebreaker (Match 1)			Seventh place tiebreaker (Match 2)
			1	J Team	W
2	Liyab Esports	L		Hong Kong Attitude	L
3	Hong Kong Attitude	W

=== Playoffs ===
- Format: Double elimination
- Top two teams qualify for the 2020 Mid-Season Showdown

Round 1 (BO3)	Round 2 (BO5)	Semifinals (WB, BO5)	Finals (BO5)
1.	Machi Esports	3
4.	Berjaya Dragons	2	R1	Berjaya Dragons	0
5.	Alpha Esports	1	R2	Machi Esports	3
R2	Talon Esports	2
2.	ahq eSports Club	2
3.	Talon Esports	2	R1	Talon Esports	3
6.	Nova Esports	0
WB	Machi Esports	2
LB	Talon Esports	3
Round 1 (BO3)	Round 2 (BO3)	Round 3 (BO3)	Semifinals (LB, BO5)
R1	Alpha Esports	1
7.	J Team	1	WB	ahq eSports Club	2	R3	ahq eSports Club	2
WB	Alpha Esports	2	R2	ahq eSports Club	2	WB	Talon Esports	3
R2	Hong Kong Attitude	0
R1	Hong Kong Attitude	2
8.	Hong Kong Attitude	2	WB	Berjaya Dragons	0
WB	Nova Esports	0

=== Ranking ===
Place	Team	Prize (USD)	Prize share	Qualification
1st	Talon Esports	$30,000	37.5%	2020 Mid-Season Showdown
2nd	Machi Esports	$14,000	17.5%	2020 Mid-Season Showdown
3rd	ahq eSports Club	$10,000	12.5%	
4th	Hong Kong Attitude	$7,000	8.75%	
5th–6th	Alpha Esports	$4,500	5.625%	
5th–6th	Berjaya Dragons	$4,500	5.625%	
7th–8th	J Team	$3,000	3.75%	
7th–8th	Nova Esports	$3,000	3.75%	
9th	Liyab Esports	$2,000	2.5%	
10th	Resurgence	$2,000	2.5%	

== Summer ==
=== Teams and rosters ===
Prior to the start of the summer split, Talon Esports announced that its League of Legends team had partnered with PSG Esports and would henceforth compete as PSG Talon.

Teams	Players					Coach
Teams	Top	Jungle	Mid	Bot	Support	Coach
ahq eSports Club	Leaky; Ziv	Kongyue	Uniboy	Wako	Ysera	GreenTea; Zero
Alpha Esports	Bush	World6; YourRiver	Chen9	WeiLun	Yursan	Xiaoya
J Team	Rest	Hana	Nestea	Lilv	Woody	Coldicee; Ratis
Machi Esports	PK	Gemini	M1ssion	Bruce	Koala	Dreamer; Mountain
Hong Kong Attitude	Kartis	Holo	MoonBlack	MnM	Tak; Wing	Skywalk
PSG Talon	Hanabi	River	Candy; Tank	Unified	Kaiwing	Bigfafa; Saroo
Berjaya Dragons	Azhi	Enso	Maoan	K2	Chilly; Do1u1u	Axin; Paul
Liyab Esports	Kanji	Doedoii	Rex	Dawn	Mocha	Cabbage; Tgee
Nova Esports	Rockky	Ryan	G4	Coldenfeet	PoP	DeuL; WarL0cK
Resurgence	Shinsekai	Epic	Raven	Mexi; Quake	BoxeR; Kusuo	Jensen; OMO

=== Regular season standings ===
- Format: Double round robin, best-of-one

Pos	Team	W	L	Pts	Qualification
1	J Team	15	3	12	Advance to winners' bracket second round
2	ahq eSports Club	14	4	10	Advance to winners' bracket second round
3	PSG Talon	14	4	10	Start in winners' bracket
4	Machi Esports	13	5	8	Start in winners' bracket
5	Alpha Esports (Note: Alpha Esports, Hong Kong Attitude, and Nova Esports were in a three-way-tie for fifth place at the end of the regular season. Alpha Esports was awarded a bye to the second tiebreaker match for having the best head-to-head record with the other two teams.)	7	11	−4	Start in winners' bracket
6	Nova Esports	7	11	−4	Start in winners' bracket
7	Hong Kong Attitude	7	11	−4	Start in losers' bracket
8	Berjaya Dragons	6	12	−6	Start in losers' bracket
9	Liyab Esports	4	14	−10	Drop to promotion tournament
10	Resurgence	3	15	−12	Drop to promotion tournament

Notes:

Fifth place tiebreaker (Match 1)			Fifth place tiebreaker (Match 2)
			1	Alpha Esports	W
2	Nova Esports	W		Nova Esports	L
3	Hong Kong Attitude	L

Second place tiebreaker
ahq eSports Club	W
PSG Talon	L

=== Playoffs ===
- Format: Double elimination
- Top two teams qualify for the 2020 World Championship

Round 1 (BO3)	Round 2 (BO5)	Semifinals (WB, BO5)	Finals (BO5)
1.	J Team	1
4.	Machi Esports	2	R1	Machi Esports	3
5.	Alpha Esports	1	R2	Machi Esports	2
R2	PSG Talon	3
2.	ahq eSports Club	2
3.	PSG Talon	2	R1	PSG Talon	3
6.	Nova Esports	0
WB	PSG Talon	0
LB	Machi Esports	3
Round 1 (BO3)	Round 2 (BO5)	Round 3 (BO5)	Semifinals (LB, BO5)
R1	Nova Esports	0
7.	Hong Kong Attitude	0	WB	J Team	3	R3	J Team	0
WB	Nova Esports	2	R2	J Team	3	WB	Machi Esports	3
R2	ahq eSports Club	1
R1	Berjaya Dragons	1
8.	Berjaya Dragons	2	WB	ahq eSports Club	3
WB	Alpha Esports	0

=== Ranking ===
Place	Team	Prize (USD)	Prize share	Qualification
1st	Machi Esports	$30,000	37.5%	2020 World Championship main event
2nd	PSG Talon	$14,000	17.5%	2020 World Championship play-in stage
3rd	J Team	$10,000	12.5%	
4th	ahq eSports Club	$7,000	8.75%	
5th–6th	Berjaya Dragons	$4,500	5.625%	
5th–6th	Nova Esports	$4,500	5.625%	
7th–8th	Alpha Esports	$3,000	3.75%	
7th–8th	Hong Kong Attitude	$3,000	3.75%	
9th	Liyab Esports	$2,000	2.5%	
10th	Resurgence	$2,000	2.5%	
