= 2022 PCS season =

Sports season

- League: Pacific Championship Series
- Sport: League of Legends
- Duration: 11 February – 17 April (Spring); 1 July – 4 September (Summer)
- Teams: 10

Spring
- Season champions: PSG Talon
- Runners-up: CTBC Flying Oyster

Summer
- Season champions: CTBC Flying Oyster
- Runners-up: Beyond Gaming

PCS seasons
- ← 2021 2023 →

The 2022 PCS season was the third year of the Pacific Championship Series (PCS), a professional esports league for the MOBA PC game League of Legends.

The spring split began with the first day of the regular season on 11 February and concluded with the spring finals on 17 April.

The summer split began with the first day of the regular season on 1 July and concluded with the summer finals on 4 September.

== Spring ==
=== Teams and rosters ===
Half of the teams in the PCS withdrew from the league prior to the 2022 season, including the PCS' representatives from the Philippines and Thailand. Berjaya Dragons, BOOM Esports, Hong Kong Attitude, Liyab Esports, and Machi Esports all withdrew from the PCS, and were replaced by CTBC Flying Oyster, Deep Cross Gaming, Frank Esports, Meta Falcon Team, and SEM9. Alpha Esports also rebranded as Hurricane Gaming.

Teams	Players					Coach(es)
Teams	Top	Jungle	Mid	Bot	Support	Coach(es)
Beyond Gaming	Liang; Likai	Husha	Minji	Wako	Kino	Benny; Wulala
CTBC Flying Oyster	Rest	Gemini	Mission	Atlen; Shunn	Koala	Achie; KMT
Deep Cross Gaming	Leaky	Hana	Nestea	Cryscata	Woody	Enzz
Hurricane Gaming	ICU	aoliao	qiaqia	BangTwo	EnHoa	Sen
J Team	Driver	Kongyue	Uniboy	Lilv	Enso	BigWei
Meta Falcon Team	Taco	665	Wen	Whale	Epoch; Renhao	Lx2
Frank Esports	Kirt	Holo	Pretender	MnM	K2; Rebirth	Skywalk
PSG Talon	Hanabi	Juhan	Bay	Unified	Kaiwing	CorGi; Tom
Impunity Esports	Quiet	tako	Faith	Blaze	CraliX pinwei	Jayz
SEM9	Shiromine	Arashi; QaspieL	Kirino; Lezar	Clayx	Felia	Axin

=== Regular season standings ===
- Format: Double round robin, best-of-one

Pos	Team	W	L	Pts	Qualification
1	PSG Talon	16	2	14	Advance to winners' bracket second round
2	J Team	14	4	10	Advance to winners' bracket second round
3	CTBC Flying Oyster	13	5	8 (Note: CTBC Flying Oyster defeated Deep Cross Gaming in a tiebreaker match.)	Start in winners' bracket
4	Deep Cross Gaming	13	5	8	Start in winners' bracket
5	Beyond Gaming	11	7	4	Start in winners' bracket
6	Meta Falcon Team	8	10	−2	Start in winners' bracket
7	Frank Esports	7	11	−4	Start in losers' bracket
8	Impunity Esports	6	12	−6	Start in losers' bracket
9	Hurricane Gaming	2	16	−14	
10	SEM9	0	18	−18	

Source: PCS Facebook page

=== Playoffs ===
- Format: Double elimination
- Winner qualifies for the 2022 Mid-Season Invitational

Round 1 (BO5)	Round 2 (BO5)	Semifinals (WB, BO5)	Finals (BO5)
1.	PSG Talon	3
4.	Deep Cross Gaming	3	R1	Deep Cross Gaming	0
5.	Beyond Gaming	1	R2	PSG Talon	1
R2	CTBC Flying Oyster	3
2.	J Team	0
3.	CTBC Flying Oyster	3	R1	CTBC Flying Oyster	3
6.	Meta Falcon Team	0
WB	CTBC Flying Oyster	2
LB	PSG Talon	3
Round 1 (BO5)	Round 2 (BO5)	Round 3 (BO5)	Semifinals (LB, BO5)
R1	Frank Esports	0
7.	Frank Esports	3	WB	Deep Cross Gaming	3	R3	J Team	2
WB	Meta Falcon Team	0	R2	Deep Cross Gaming	1	WB	PSG Talon	3
R2	J Team	3
R1	Beyond Gaming	2
8.	Impunity Esports	0	WB	J Team	3
WB	Beyond Gaming	3

=== Ranking ===
Place	Team	Prize (USD)	Prize share	Qualification
1st	PSG Talon	$30,000	37.5%	2022 Mid-Season Invitational
2nd	CTBC Flying Oyster	$14,000	17.5%	
3rd	J Team	$10,000	12.5%	
4th	Deep Cross Gaming	$7,000	8.75%	
5th–6th	Beyond Gaming	$4,500	5.625%	
5th–6th	Frank Esports	$4,500	5.625%	
7th–8th	Impunity Esports	$3,000	3.75%	
7th–8th	Meta Falcon Team	$3,000	3.75%	
9th	Hurricane Gaming	$2,000	2.5%	
10th	SEM9	$2,000	2.5%	

== Summer ==
=== Teams and rosters ===
Dewish Team acquired the PCS spot of Hurricane Gaming prior to the start of the summer split.

Teams	Players					Coach(es)
Teams	Top	Jungle	Mid	Bot	Support	Coach(es)
Beyond Gaming	Liang; Likai	Husha	Minji; SeNBon	Wako	Kino	Benny; Wulala
CTBC Flying Oyster	Rest	Gemini	Mission	Atlen; Shunn	Koala	Achie; KMT
Deep Cross Gaming	Leaky	Hana	Nestea	Cryscata	Woody	Coldicee
Dewish Team	Lacunae	WSL	xiaotu	BangTwo	EnHoa	Sen
J Team	Driver; Rock	Kongyue	Uniboy	Lilv	Enso	BigWei; Nash
Meta Falcon Team	Taco	665; Renhao; Hong2	Wen; Hong2	Whale	1SSUE	Lx2
Frank Esports	YSKM	Holo	Pretender	MnM	Keres; Rebirth	Skywalk; Jazkit
PSG Talon	Hanabi	Burry	Gori	Unified	Kaiwing	CorGi; Tom
Impunity Esports	ICU; Jackpot	Alex	Apex; Husky	Anex; Lz	Natur3; Winnie; Yusin	2188; Zest; Dreamer; REFRA1N
SEM9	N0name	Arashi; QaspieL	Lezar; Axin; XieDoDo	XieDoDo; QaspieL; Axin	Axin; Felia; QaspieL	AhWood

=== Regular season standings ===
- Format: Double round robin, best-of-one

Pos	Team	W	L	Pts	Qualification
1	PSG Talon	14	4	10	Advance to winners' bracket second round
2	Deep Cross Gaming	13	5	8 (Note: Deep Cross Gaming defeated J Team in a tiebreaker match.)	Advance to winners' bracket second round
3	J Team	13	5	8	Start in winners' bracket
4	CTBC Flying Oyster	12	6	6 (Note: CTBC Flying Oyster defeated Frank Esports in a tiebreaker match.)	Start in winners' bracket
5	Frank Esports	12	6	6	Start in winners' bracket
6	Beyond Gaming	11	7	4	Start in winners' bracket
7	Meta Falcon Team	6	12	−6	Start in losers' bracket
8	Impunity Esports	5	13	−8	Start in losers' bracket
9	SEM9	2	16	−14 (Note: SEM9 had the better head-to-head record against Dewish Team (2–0).)	
10	Dewish Team	2	16	−14	

Source: PCS Facebook page

=== Playoffs ===
- Format: Double elimination
- Winner and runner-up qualify for the 2022 World Championship

Round 1 (BO5)	Round 2 (BO5)	Semifinals (WB, BO5)	Finals (BO5)
1.	PSG Talon	2
4.	CTBC Flying Oyster	3	R1	CTBC Flying Oyster	3
5.	Frank Esports	1	R2	CTBC Flying Oyster	3
R2	Beyond Gaming	1
2.	Deep Cross Gaming	0
3.	J Team	1	R1	Beyond Gaming	3
6.	Beyond Gaming	3
WB	CTBC Flying Oyster	3
LB	Beyond Gaming	0
Round 1 (BO5)	Round 2 (BO5)	Round 3 (BO5)	Semifinals (LB, BO5)
R1	J Team	0
7.	Meta Falcon Team	0	WB	PSG Talon	3	R3	PSG Talon	2
WB	J Team	3	R2	PSG Talon	3	WB	Beyond Gaming	3
R2	Deep Cross Gaming	1
R1	Frank Esports	0
8.	Impunity Esports	1	WB	Deep Cross Gaming	3
WB	Frank Esports	3

=== Ranking ===
Place	Team	Prize (USD)	Prize share	Qualification
1st	CTBC Flying Oyster	$30,000	37.5%	2022 World Championship main event
2nd	Beyond Gaming	$14,000	17.5%	2022 World Championship play-in stage
3rd	PSG Talon	$10,000	12.5%	
4th	Deep Cross Gaming	$7,000	8.75%	
5th–6th	Frank Esports	$4,500	5.625%	
5th–6th	J Team	$4,500	5.625%	
7th–8th	Impunity Esports	$3,000	3.75%	
7th–8th	Meta Falcon Team	$3,000	3.75%	
9th	SEM9	$2,000	2.5%	
10th	Dewish Team	$2,000	2.5%	
