= 2021 PCS season =

- League: Pacific Championship Series
- Sport: League of Legends
- Duration: 19 February – 18 April (Spring); 9 July – 29 August (Summer)
- Number of teams: 10

Spring
- Season champions: PSG Talon
- Runners-up: Beyond Gaming

Summer
- Season champions: PSG Talon
- Runners-up: Beyond Gaming

PCS seasons
- ← 2020 2022 →

The 2021 PCS season was the second year of the Pacific Championship Series (PCS), a professional esports league for the MOBA PC game League of Legends.

The spring regular season was scheduled to begin on 5 February but was delayed to 19 February due to regional COVID-19 restrictions. The spring split concluded with the spring finals on 18 April.

The summer split began with the first day of the summer regular season on 9 July and concluded with the summer finals on 29 August.

PSG Talon was the PCS' representative at the 2021 Mid-Season Invitational and first seed at the 2021 World Championship. Beyond Gaming was the PCS' second seed at the 2021 World Championship.

== Spring ==
=== Promotion and relegation ===
The organisers of the PCS announced on 4 August 2020 that a promotion tournament would be introduced for the 2021 season to promote regional competitiveness. Singaporean team Resurgence, which finished tenth in both splits of the 2020 season, had to play a relegation match against Impunity Esports from the Singaporean and Malaysian qualifier. Resurgence was relegated after a close series and Impunity Esports took their spot. Filipino team Liyab Esports, which finished ninth in both splits of the 2020 season, swept Panic Time from the Filipino qualifier in their relegation match and kept their spot.

Qualification match
PCS	Resurgence	2
QLF	Impunity Esports	3
PCS	Liyab Esports	3
QLF	Panic Time	0

=== Teams and rosters ===
ahq eSports Club announced on 6 January 2021 that it would no longer participate in the PCS. Xue "Dinter" Hong-wei, who was previously the jungler for Taipei Assassins and Hong Kong Esports, acquired ahq's spot and created a new team named Beyond Gaming. Nova Esports also withdrew from the league and was replaced by BOOM Esports.

Teams	Players					Coach(es)
Teams	Top	Jungle	Mid	Bot	Support	Coach(es)
Alpha Esports	3Z	kiy1n9	APEX	AN	Zihan	Taizan; Laba
Beyond Gaming	Liang; PK	Husha	Husky; Maoan	Doggo	Kino	Benny
J Team	Rest; Driver	Hana	Mission	Lilv	Woody	Wei; Coldicee
Machi Esports	Likai	Gemini	JimieN	Atlen	Koala	Dreamer; Gengar
Hong Kong Attitude	Rock	Patience; Kongyue	B1ven	MnM	Wing	Chawy; Reign
PSG Talon	Hanabi	River	Maple	Unified	Kaiwing	Helper; Winged
Berjaya Dragons	Azhi	Enso	Minji	Eren	K2	Axin
BOOM Esports	Rockky	Epic	Ruby	Wako	PoP	Warlock; Hammock
Impunity Esports	TOPKING	CYH	Shera	Blaze	Smerv	Shiazuri; Vainie
Liyab Esports	Speltz	DoeDoii	Xyliath; Kanji	Dawn	Cresho	Cabbage; Tgee
Source: LoL PCS official website

=== Regular season standings ===
- Format: Double round robin, best-of-one

Pos	Team	W	L	Pts	Qualification
1	PSG Talon	17	1	16	Advance to winners' bracket second round
2	Beyond Gaming	16	2	14	Advance to winners' bracket second round
3	Machi Esports	14	4	10	Start in winners' bracket
4	J Team	11	7	4	Start in winners' bracket
5	BOOM Esports	8	10	−2	Start in winners' bracket
6	Impunity Esports	7	11	−4	Start in winners' bracket
7	Berjaya Dragons	6	12	−6	Start in losers' bracket
8	Hong Kong Attitude	5	13	−8 (Note: Hong Kong Attitude defeated Alpha Esports in a tiebreaker match.)	Start in losers' bracket
9	Alpha Esports	5	13	−8	
10	Liyab Esports	1	17	−16	

Source: LoL PCS official website

=== Playoffs ===
- Format: Double elimination
- Winner qualifies for the 2021 Mid-Season Invitational

Round 1 (BO3)	Round 2 (BO5)	Semifinals (WB, BO5)	Finals (BO5)
1.	PSG Talon	3
4.	J Team	2	R1	J Team	0
5.	BOOM Esports	1	R2	PSG Talon	3
R2	Beyond Gaming	0
2.	Beyond Gaming	3
3.	Machi Esports	2	R1	Machi Esports	1
6.	Impunity Esports	0
WB	PSG Talon	3
LB	Beyond Gaming	0
Round 1 (BO3)	Round 2 (BO5)	Round 3 (BO5)	Semifinals (LB, BO5)
R1	Berjaya Dragons	0
7.	Berjaya Dragons	2	WB	J Team	3	R3	Machi Esports	2
WB	Impunity Esports	0	R2	J Team	0	WB	Beyond Gaming	3
R2	Machi Esports	3
R1	Hong Kong Attitude	0
8.	Hong Kong Attitude	2	WB	Machi Esports	3
WB	BOOM Esports	1

=== Ranking ===
Place	Team	Prize (USD)	Prize share	Qualification
1st	PSG Talon	$30,000	37.5%	2021 Mid-Season Invitational
2nd	Beyond Gaming	$14,000	17.5%	
3rd	Machi Esports	$10,000	12.5%	
4th	J Team	$7,000	8.75%	
5th–6th	Berjaya Dragons	$4,500	5.625%	
5th–6th	Hong Kong Attitude	$4,500	5.625%	
7th–8th	BOOM Esports	$3,000	3.75%	
7th–8th	Impunity Esports	$3,000	3.75%	
9th	Alpha Esports	$2,000	2.5%	
10th	Liyab Esports	$2,000	2.5%	

== Summer ==
=== Teams and rosters ===
Teams	Players					Coach(es)
Teams	Top	Jungle	Mid	Bot	Support	Coach(es)
Alpha Esports	3Z	kiy1n9	Xiaotu	AN	Sheng	Laba
Beyond Gaming	Liang; PK	Husha	Maoan	Doggo	Kino	Benny; Wulala
J Team	Rest	Hana	Mission	Lilv	Woody	Wei; Coldicee
Machi Esports	Likai	Gemini	JimieN	Atlen	Koala	Dreamer; Gengar
Hong Kong Attitude	Rock	Kongyue	HongSuo; Wen; Biven	MnM	s1aytrue K	Chawy; Manny
PSG Talon	Hanabi	River	Maple	Unified	Kaiwing	Helper; Winged
Berjaya Dragons	Azhi	Enso; Arashi	Minji	K2	Felia	Axin
BOOM Esports	Rockky	Alex; Holo	Ruby	Wako	Pop	Warlock
Impunity Esports	TOPKING	Epic	Moonblack	Blaze	Smerv; CraliX	Shiazuri; YaLEN
Liyab Esports	Speltz; Kanji	DoeDoii	Xyliath; Kanji	Dawn	Aeiden	Tgee
Source: LoL PCS official website

=== Regular season standings ===
- Format: Double round robin, best-of-one

Pos	Team	W	L	Pts	Qualification
1	PSG Talon	18	0	18	Advance to winners' bracket second round
2	Beyond Gaming	14	4	10 (Note: Beyond Gaming defeated Machi Esports in a tiebreaker match.)	Advance to winners' bracket second round
3	Machi Esports	14	4	10	Start in winners' bracket
4	BOOM Esports	11	7	4 (Note: BOOM Esports defeated J Team in a tiebreaker match.)	Start in winners' bracket
5	J Team	11	7	4	Start in winners' bracket
6	Hong Kong Attitude	7	11	−4	Start in winners' bracket
7	Berjaya Dragons	6	12	−6	Start in losers' bracket
8	Liyab Esports	4	14	−10 (Note: Liyab Esports defeated Impunity Esports in a tiebreaker match.)	Start in losers' bracket
9	Impunity Esports	4	14	−10	
10	Alpha Esports	1	17	−16	

Source: LoL PCS official website

=== Playoffs ===
- Format: Double elimination
- Winner and runner-up qualify for the 2021 World Championship

Round 1 (BO3)	Round 2 (BO5)	Semifinals (WB, BO5)	Finals (BO5)
1.	PSG Talon	3
4.	BOOM Esports	1	R1	J Team	0
5.	J Team	2	R2	PSG Talon	2
R2	Beyond Gaming	3
2.	Beyond Gaming	3
3.	Machi Esports	2	R1	Machi Esports	1
6.	Hong Kong Attitude	1
WB	Beyond Gaming	2
LB	PSG Talon	3
Round 1 (BO3)	Round 2 (BO5)	Round 3 (BO5)	Semifinals (LB, BO5)
R1	Hong Kong Attitude	1
7.	Berjaya Dragons	0	WB	J Team	3	R3	J Team	0
WB	Hong Kong Attitude	2	R2	J Team	3	WB	PSG Talon	3
R2	Machi Esports	2
R1	BOOM Esports	2
8.	Liyab Esports	1	WB	Machi Esports	3
WB	BOOM Esports	2

=== Ranking ===
Place	Team	Prize (USD)	Prize share	Qualification
1st	PSG Talon	$30,000	37.5%	2021 World Championship main event
2nd	Beyond Gaming	$14,000	17.5%	2021 World Championship play-in stage
3rd	J Team	$10,000	12.5%	
4th	Machi Esports	$7,000	8.75%	
5th–6th	BOOM Esports	$4,500	5.625%	
5th–6th	Hong Kong Attitude	$4,500	5.625%	
7th–8th	Berjaya Dragons	$3,000	3.75%	
7th–8th	Liyab Esports	$3,000	3.75%	
9th	Impunity Esports	$2,000	2.5%	
10th	Alpha Esports	$2,000	2.5%	
