= Beyond Gaming =

Taiwanese League of Legends team (2021–2024)

- Short name: BYG
- Game: League of Legends
- Founded: 27 January 2021
- Folded: 20 April 2024
- League: Pacific Championship Series
- Based in: Taipei, Taiwan
- Owner: Xue "Dinter" Hong-wei
- Head coach: Lien "Benny" Hsiu-chi
- Manager: Hsieh "KK" Kun-han
- Main sponsor: Mega Bank

Beyond Gaming was a Taiwanese professional League of Legends team competing in the Pacific Championship Series. It was founded in 2021 by former professional League of Legends player Xue "Dinter" Hong-wei, after he purchased the PCS spot of ahq eSports Club. Xue announced the team's disbandment in 2024, citing the deterioration of his mental health due to the team's inability to find sponsors amid rising operational costs.

Beyond Gaming qualified for the prestigious World Championship twice, in 2021 and 2022. The team's highest placement was 17th to 18th out of 22 teams.

== History ==
=== Founding ===
Xue "Dinter" Hong-wei, formerly the jungler for Taipei Assassins and Hong Kong Esports, founded Beyond Gaming on 27 January 2021 after he purchased the PCS spot of ahq eSports Club.

Beyond Gaming's inaugural roster did not include any players from ahq's final starting roster. However, Beyond Gaming signed ahq's substitute bot laner, Chiu "Doggo" Tzu-chuan, on 4 February 2021. The team also acquired top laner Hsieh "PK" Yu-ting from Machi Esports and signed several rookies. Mid laner Chien "Maoan" Mao-an joined from Berjaya Dragons on 3 March to round out the seven-man roster.

=== 2021 season ===
Beyond Gaming finished second in the spring regular season, receiving a bye to the second round of playoffs in the winners' bracket. There, Beyond Gaming defeated Machi Esports 3–1 and advanced to the semifinal match in the winners' bracket, against PSG Talon. After being swept by PSG Talon, Beyond Gaming faced off against Machi Esports once again, this time in the losers' bracket semifinals. Beyond Gaming won their rematch against Machi Esports after a close series, and advanced to their first PCS finals. Beyond Gaming was swept by PSG Talon again in the finals, and finished second overall in their inaugural split.

Repeating their success in the spring season, Beyond Gaming finished second in the summer regular season and defeated Machi Esports 3–1 in the second round of playoffs in the winners' bracket. Beyond Gaming then faced off against PSG Talon once again in the semifinal match in the winners' bracket, this time defeating PSG Talon 3–2 and qualifying for the 2021 World Championship in their inaugural season. Beyond Gaming then advanced to their second PCS finals, where they lost 2–3 to PSG Talon.

For the 2021 World Championship play-in stage, Beyond Gaming was drawn into Group B, along with North American team Cloud9, Japanese team DetonatioN FocusMe, Russian team Unicorns of Love, and Turkish team Galatasaray Esports. Beyond Gaming ended the round robin tied for last with Unicorns of Love, but managed to win the subsequent tiebreaker match to advance to the play-in knockout stage. Despite expectations of an easy series for Beyond Gaming, they barely managed to avoid elimination after reverse sweeping Galatasaray Esports. Immediately after the series, Riot Games announced that Maoan would be suspended for the rest of the tournament due to allegations of match fixing made against him. Beyond Gaming had only brought a substitute top laner to the tournament, and so the team's two top laners were forced to alternate between top and mid in their qualification match against Hanwha Life Esports. Beyond Gaming was subsequently swept by Hanwha Life Esports and eliminated from the tournament.

=== 2022 season ===
Following their disappointing showing at Worlds 2021, Beyond Gaming revamped their roster, picking up top laner Liao "Likai" Li-kai from Machi Esports and replacing bot laner Doggo with Tsou "Wako" Wei-yang from BOOM Esports. Beyond Gaming finished fifth in the spring regular season and qualified for the first round of playoffs in the winners' bracket. After losing to Deep Cross Gaming, Beyond Gaming were knocked down to the losers' bracket, where they swept eighth-place Impunity Esports in the first round. Advancing to the second round of the losers' bracket, Beyond Gaming were unable to defeat and second-place J Team and were eliminated from playoffs, placing fifth to sixth overall.

Beyond Gaming did not make any changes to their starting roster for the summer split, but they experimented with substitute mid laner Wu "SeNBon" Si-yu at the beginning of the regular season before permanently returning Minji to the starting position. Beyond Gaming finished sixth in the regular season, qualifying them for the first round of playoffs in the winners' bracket. In a series of unexpected results, Beyond Gaming took a convincing victory over third-place J Team in the first round before sweeping second-place Deep Cross Gaming in the second round. However, in the winners' bracket semifinals, Beyond Gaming was unable to defeat fourth-place CTBC Flying Oyster, which had defeated defending champions PSG Talon in their match in the second round. After narrowly defeating PSG Talon in the losers' bracket semifinals, Beyond Gaming advanced to their third finals and qualified for the 2022 World Championship as one of the PCS' two representatives. In the finals, Beyond Gaming once again lost to CTBC Flying Oyster, this time in a more decisive manner, with the latter sweeping the former.

=== 2024 season ===
Beyond Gaming's owner, Xue "Dinter" Hong-wei, announced the disbandment of the team on 20 April 2024. Xue stated that the costs to maintain the team's performance and position at the top of the PCS had risen significantly, all the while he had been unable to secure financial sponsors for the team. This had brought considerable strain on Xue's mental health, which ultimately led to his decision of disbanding the team.

== Tournament results ==
| Placement | Event | Final result (W–L) |
|---|---|---|
| 2nd | 2021 PCS Spring Split | 16–2 |
| 2nd | 2021 PCS Spring Playoffs | 0–3 (against PSG Talon) |
| 2nd | 2021 PCS Summer Split | 14–4 |
| 2nd | 2021 PCS Summer Playoffs | 2–3 (against PSG Talon) |
| 17th–18th | 2021 World Championship | 0–3 (against Hanwha Life Esports) |
| 5th | 2022 PCS Spring Split | 11–7 |
| 5th–6th | 2022 PCS Spring Playoffs | 2–3 (against J Team) |
| 6th | 2022 PCS Summer Split | 11–7 |
| 2nd | 2022 PCS Summer Playoffs | 0–3 (against CTBC Flying Oyster) |
| 21st–22nd | 2022 World Championship | 2–3 |
