= Karsa (gamer) =

Taiwanese League of Legends player

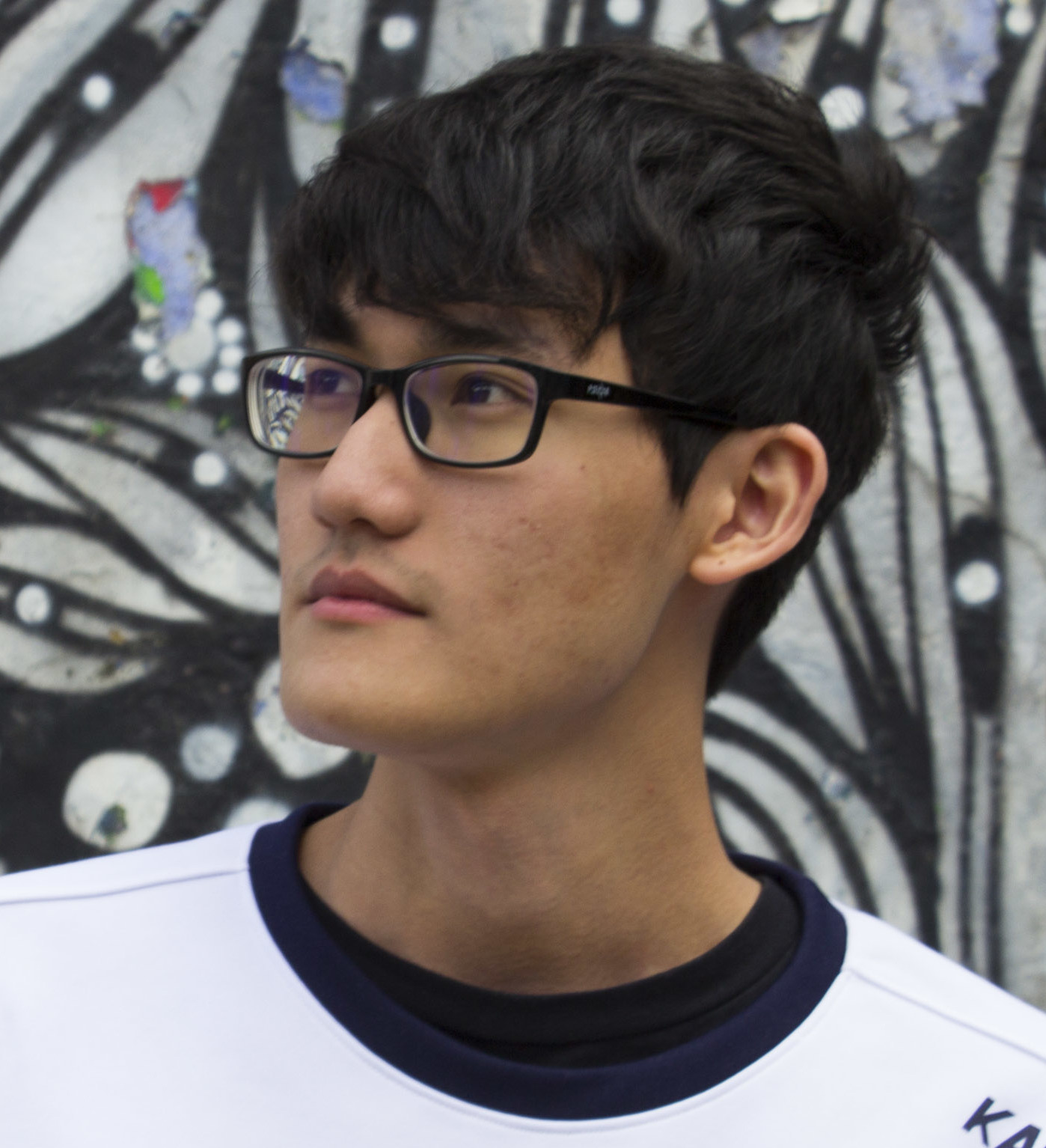
- Hung in 2017

Personal information
- Name: Hung Hao-hsuan
- Born: 14 February 1997 (age 29)
- Nationality: Taiwanese

Current team
- Team: Talon Esports
- Role: Jungler
- Game: League of Legends
- League: Championship Pacific

Career information
- Playing career: 2014–2025

Team history
- 2014: Machi 17
- 2015–2017: Flash Wolves
- 2018–2019: Royal Never Give Up
- 2020–2021: Top Esports
- 2022: Victory Five
- 2023: Weibo Gaming
- 2024: CTBC Flying Oyster
- 2025: Talon Esports

Career highlights and awards
- MSI champion (2018); MSC champion (2020); Rift Rivals champion (2018); 3× LPL champion; 4× LMS champion

Chinese name
- Traditional Chinese: 洪浩軒
- Simplified Chinese: 洪浩轩
Transcriptions
Standard Mandarin
- Hanyu Pinyin: Hóng Hàoxuān
Southern Min
- Hokkien POJ: Âng Hō Hian
Medal record
Esports
Representing Chinese Taipei
Asian Games
Silver medal – second place	2022 Hangzhou	League of Legends

Hung Hao-hsuan (Chinese: 洪浩軒; born 14 February 1997), better known as Karsa, is a Taiwanese former professional League of Legends player. He is known for his strategic jungle play and found success domestically and internationally during his time as a member of the Flash Wolves, winning several LMS titles and topping many international events. Hung has long been considered by many analysts and other professional players as one of the most mechanically skillful players from Taiwan.

He also represented the Chinese Taipei national team at the 2022 Asian Games, earning a silver medal.

== Career ==
=== Machi 17 ===
Hung began his professional career in June 2014 with team Machi 17.

=== Flash Wolves ===
In January 2015, Hung joined Flash Wolves. Due to their 1st-place finish at IEM Taipei, Flash Wolves were invited to compete at the IEM Season IX - World Championship. After a Round 1 loss against SK Gaming, Hung and the team went on to beat Cloud9 in Round 1 of the losers bracket. Round 2 of the losers bracket saw the team's 2nd meeting of the tournament with SK Gaming. A win against the European team secured the yoe Flash Wolves a place in the bracket stage. They were eventually knocked out of the tournament in the semifinals after losing to Team SoloMid.

With a second and third place LMS finish under their belt, the Flash Wolves had obtained a tie for the most LMS Championship Points behind AHQ, and were invited to the 2015 Taiwan Regional Finals. There, FW avenged their playoff loss by defeating Hong Kong Esports 3-2 and acquiring a spot in the 2015 Season World Championship.

At the World Championship, the FW were expected by many analysts to have one of the weakest showings of any team in attendance. However, after a 4-2 group stage with wins over favorites KOO Tigers and Counter Logic Gaming, the Flash Wolves emerged first from groups, becoming the first team in two years to finish ahead of a Korean team in groups at Worlds. In the tournament quarterfinals, FW lost 1–3 to Origen, earning a top eight finish.

Hung and the Flash Wolves won the 2016 Spring LMS, qualifying for the 2016 Mid-Season Invitational. At MSI Flash Wolves reached the semi-finals of the 2016 Mid-Season Invitational.

On 2 December 2017, it was announced that Hung had left Flash Wolves.

=== Royal Never Give Up ===
Later, on 20 December, it was announced that he had joined the Chinese team Royal Never Give Up (RNG). In his first season with RNG, Hung won the 2018 Spring LPL season and qualified for the 2018 Mid-Season Invitational. Hung left Royal Never Give Up in November 2019.

=== Top Esports ===
Hung signed with Top Esports in December 2019.

== Tournament results ==
=== Flash Wolves ===
- 2015 Intel Extreme Masters Season9 Taipei — 1st
- 2015 League of Legends World Championship — 4th–8th
- 2016 Spring LMS — 1st
- 2016 Mid-Season Invitational — 3rd−4th
- 2016 Summer LMS — 1st
- 2017 Intel Extreme Masters Season11 World Championship Katowice — 1st
- 2017 Spring LMS — 1st
- 2017 Summer LMS — 1st

=== Royal Never Give Up ===
- 2018 Spring LPL — 1st
- 2018 Mid-Season Invitational — 1st
- 2018 Summer LPL — 1st

=== Top Esports ===
- 2018 LPL Spring — 2nd
- 2020 LPL Spring — 2nd
- 2020 Mid-Season Cup — 1st
- 2020 LPL Summer — 1st
