= MAD Team =

Taiwanese esports organization (2017–2023)

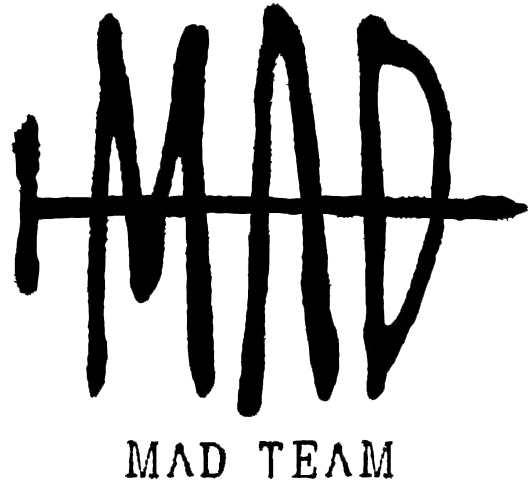
- Founded: 28 November 2017
- Folded: 1 January 2023
- League: Garena Challenger Series (GCS); League of Legends Master Series (LMS)
- Location: Taiwan
- Owner: Shawn Yue
- Website: www.madteam.com.tw

MAD Team was a Taiwanese esports organization founded on 28 November 2017 by Hong Kong actor Shawn Yue. It had a League of Legends team competing in the League of Legends Master Series (LMS), the top level of professional League of Legends in Taiwan, Hong Kong, and Macau. The organization dissolved on 1 January 2023.

== Arena of Valor ==
On 29 November 2017, it was announced that the roster and Garena Challenger Series (GCS) spot of ahq White had been acquired by MAD Team. MAD Team placed sixth in the 2018 GCS Spring Series and fifth in the 2018 GCS Summer Series. After winning the 2019 GCS Spring Series, MAD Team qualified for the 2019 Arena of Valor World Cup as Taiwan's representative.

== League of Legends ==
On 28 November 2017, it was announced that the LMS spot of ahq Fighter had been acquired and rebranded to MAD Team. Top laners Wu "Liang" Liang-Te and Tsai "Rock" Chung-Ting, junglers Lien "Benny" Hsiu-Chi and Hsiao "Kongyue" Jen-Tso, and mid laner Chen "Uniboy" Chang-Chu joined from ahq Fighter, while Huang "Breeze" Chien-Yuan and Ke "K" Kai-Sheng were acquired from Wayi Spider.

MAD Team debuted in the 2018 LMS Spring Split and placed fourth in the regular season with a 6–8 record, earning them a spot in playoffs, where they defeated Machi Esports 3–1 in the first round, but lost to 0–3 G-Rex in the second. MAD Team was one of four teams that represented the LMS at Rift Rivals 2018 LCK-LPL-LMS, the others being the Flash Wolves, G-Rex, and Machi Esports. The team lost all their matches in the tournament.

MAD Team placed second in the 2018 LMS Summer regular season with a 10–4 record. The team earned the second seed in playoffs, winning their first series 3–0 against J Team, but losing 0–3 to the Flash Wolves in the finals. MAD Team accrued the most championship points throughout the 2018 LMS season, allowing them to qualify for the main event of the 2018 World Championship as the league's second seed.

For the 2018 World Championship's main event, MAD Team was drafted into Group C, along with KT Rolster, EDward Gaming, and Team Liquid. The team failed to win a single game and ended the group stage with a 0–6 record.
