= List of League of Legends leagues and tournaments =

League of Legends is an esports game widely played at both amateur and professional levels. This is a list of League of Legends competitions organized or sponsored by the game's publisher, Riot Games.

== International tournaments ==
Name	Tier	Location	Established	Size	Latest winner	Most titles
First Stand Tournament	Major	various	2025	8	(China) Bilibili Gaming (2026)	(South Korea) Hanwha Life Esports (1 title) (China) Bilibili Gaming (1 title)
Mid-Season Invitational	Major	various	2015	11	(South Korea) Hanwha Life Esports (2026)	(China) Royal Never Give Up (3 titles)
World Championship	Major	various	2011	19	(China) Bilibili Gaming (2026)	(South Korea) T1 (6 titles)

== Tier 1 leagues ==
Beginning in 2026, there are 6 regional professional leagues for League of Legends around the world.

- For the First Stand Tournament after the first split of season, each region will allocate 1 spot each, total 6 teams compete.
- For the Mid-Season Invitational after second split of season, each region (except CBLOL) will allocate 2 spots each, with the CBLOL getting 1 spot, total 11 teams compete.
- For the World Championship with 19 spots:
  - Each league (except CBLOL) will allocate 3 spots (CBLOL getting 2 spots) each at minimum.
  - A spot is guaranteed for the Mid-Season Invitational champion, if it reaches the Playoffs in their domestic third split or season.
  - An additional spot is also granted to the second best region from the latest Mid-Season Invitational.

Name	Abbr.	Region	Main casting language(s)	Location(s)	Established	Size	FST	MSI	WC										
Name	Abbr.	Region	Main casting language(s)	Location(s)	Established	Size	FST	MSI	WC	Campeonato Brasileiro de League of Legends	CBLOL	Brazil	Brazilian Portuguese, Spanish	São Paulo	2012	8	1	1	2
League of Legends Champions Korea	LCK	South Korea	Korean	Seoul	2012	10	1	2	3										
League of Legends Championship Pacific	LCP	Asia-Pacific	Japanese, Mandarin, Cantonese, Vietnamese, English	Taipei	2025	8	1	2	3										
League Championship Series	LCS	(United States) (Canada) (Mexico) North America	English, Spanish	Los Angeles	2013	8	1	2	3										
League of Legends EMEA Championship	LEC	(Middle East and North Africa) (African Union) Europe, the Middle East and Africa	English	Berlin	2013	10	1	2	3										
League of Legends Pro League	LPL	China	Mandarin	various	2013	14	1	2	3										

== League cups ==
Name	Region	Location	Established	Size	Latest winner
Demacia Cup/Championship	China	Chongqing	2013	16	Invictus Gaming
KeSPA Cup	South Korea	Seoul	2015	14	T1

== Tier 2 and lower leagues ==
Name	Tier	Region	Location	Established	Size
Americas Challengers	2nd (academy)	Americas	offline	2024	6
Pacific Challengers League	2nd & 3rd (academy/amateur)	TW, HK, MC, SEA and Oceania	online	2023	No limit
Asia Star Challengers Invitational	2nd & 3rd (academy/amateur)	Asian regions (CN/KR/LCP)	online	2022	16
Pacific Championship Series (PCS)	2nd (professional)	Asia-Pacific	online	2025	TBD
Vietnam Championship Series (VCS)	2nd (professional)	Vietnam	online	2025	TBD
League of Legends Japan League (LJL)	2nd (professional)	Japan	online	2024	12–16
EMEA Masters	2nd (professional)	(Middle East and North Africa) (African Union) Europe, the Middle East and Africa	various	2023	60
North American Challengers League	2nd & 3rd (academy/amateur)	(United States) (Canada) North America	Los Angeles	2018	10
La Ligue Francaise (LFL)	3rd (professional)	France	various	2019	10
Türkiye Championship League	3rd (professional)	Turkey	online	2024	8
Prime League Division 1	3rd (professional)	Germany/Austria/Switzerland	various	2020	10
Rift Legends	3rd (professional)	(Estonia) (Latvia) (Lithuania) Poland/Baltics	various	2025	8
LVP Superliga	3rd (professional)	Spain	various	2011	10
Northern League of Legends Championship	3rd (professional)	(Nordic countries) (United Kingdom) (Republic of Ireland) Nordics/UK/Ireland	various	2020	16
PG Nationals	3rd (professional)	Italy	online	2018	8
Liga Portuguesa de League of Legends	3rd (professional)	Portugal	online	2015	8
Greek Legends League	3rd (professional)	Greece	Athens	2019	8
Arabian League	3rd (professional)	Middle East and North Africa	various	2020	8
LCK Challengers League	2nd (semi-professional)	South Korea	Seoul	2021	10
LCK Academy Series	2nd & 3rd (academy/amateur)	South Korea	various	2022	No limit
League of Legends Development League	2nd (academy)	China	various	2018	24
Vietnam Championship Series B	2nd (semi-professional)	Vietnam	various	2013	10
TBLE Rising Star	2nd & 3rd (academy/amateur)	Vietnam	Ho Chi Minh	2024	12
Circuito Desafiante	2nd (academy/semi-professional)	Brazil	São Paulo	2025	10
Academi Ligi	2nd (academy)	Turkey	Istanbul	2019	8
Liga Regional Norte	2nd (semi-professional)	(Caribbean Community) (Federal Republic of Central America) Mexico/Caribbean/Central America/Colombia/Ecuador	online	2023	10
Liga Regional Sur	2nd (semi-professional)	Argentina/Chile/Peru	online	2023	10
Liga Nacional México	3rd (semi-professional)	Mexico	online	2019	16
Liga Nacional Centro América y Caribe	3rd (semi-professional)	(Caribbean Community) (Federal Republic of Central America) Caribbean/Central America	online	2022	16
Liga Nacional Colombia	3rd (semi-professional)	Colombia	online	2019	16
Liga Nacional Ecuador	3rd (semi-professional)	Ecuador	online	2021	16
Liga Nacional Chile	3rd (semi-professional)	Chile	online	2019	16
Liga Nacional Argentina	3rd (semi-professional)	Argentina	online	2019	16
Liga Nacional Perú	3rd (semi-professional)	Peru	online	2021	16
League of Legends Nusantara Cup	3rd (semi-professional)	Indonesia	online	2025	7
League of Legends Titans Cup	3rd (semi-professional)	Malaysia/Singapore	online	2025	8
Liga Republika	3rd (semi-professional)	Philippines	online	2024	12
League of Legends Thailand Series	3rd (semi-professional)	Thailand	online	2025	8
Legends Ascend South Asia	3rd (semi-professional)	South Asia	online	2025	9

== Former tier 1 and 2 leagues ==
=== Upgraded or downgraded leagues ===
Name	Former tier	Region	Location	Established	Ended	Size	Qualified for	Changed to
Vietnam Championship Series A (VCSA)	2nd (professional)	Vietnam	Online	2013	2017	8	GPL Qualification	Vietnam Championship Series, upgraded to tier 1, got directly spots to MSI and Worlds
Vietnam Championship Series (VCS)	1st (professional)	Vietnam	Ho Chi Minh City	2017	2024	8	Worlds 2P	Still Vietnam Championship Series, downgraded to tier 2 and no longer directly has spots to MSI and Worlds, became domestic league that can promote teams to LCP
Pacific Championship Series (PCS)	1st (professional)	Asia-Pacific	Online	2020	2024	8+2+3	Worlds 2P	Still Pacific Championship Series, downgraded to tier 2 and no longer directly has spots to MSI and Worlds, became domestic league that can promote teams to LCP
Turkish Championship League (TCL)	1st (professional)	Turkey	Istanbul	2015	2022	10	Worlds 1P	Türkiye Championship League, downgraded to tier 3 and no longer directly has spots to MSI and Worlds, become a qualification of tier 2 event EMEA Masters
League of Legends Circuit Oceania (LCO)	1st (professional)	(Australia) (New Zealand) Oceania	Sydney	2021	2022	8	Worlds 1P	Downgraded to tier 2 and no longer directly has spots to MSI and Worlds, become a qualification to PCS
League of Legends Japan League (LJL)	1st (professional)	Japan	Tokyo	2014	2023	8	Worlds 1P	Downgraded to tier 2 and no longer directly has spots to MSI and Worlds, become a qualification to PCS and later domestic league that can promote teams to LCP

=== Replaced ===
Name	Tier	Region	Location	Established	Ended	Size	Qualified for	Replaced by
European Masters	2nd (professional)	Europe	various	2018	2022	16	N/A	EMEA Masters
Circuito Desafiante	2nd (semi-professional)	Brazil	Rio de Janeiro	2015	2020	6	CBLoL Promotion	CBLOL Academy
CBLOL Academy	2nd (academy)	Brazil	São Paulo	2020	2024	10	N/A	Circuito Desafiante
Nordic Championship	3rd (professional)	Nordics		2018	2020	10	European Masters Qualification	Northern LoL Championship (merged)
United Kingdom League Championship	3rd (professional)	(Republic of Ireland) United Kingdom/Ireland	Online	2019	2020	9	European Masters Qualification	Northern LoL Championship (merged)
Ultraliga	3rd (professional)	(Estonia) (Latvia) (Lithuania) Poland/Baltics	various	2018	2024	8	EMEA Masters Qualification	Rift Legends
League of Legends Challengers Korea	2nd (semi-professional)	South Korea	Seoul	2015	2020	10	LCK Promotion	LCK Challengers League
Oceanic Pro League (OPL)	1st (professional)	(Australia) (New Zealand) Oceania	Sydney	2015	2020	8	Worlds 1P	League of Legends Circuit Oceania
League of Legends Master Series	1st (professional)	Taiwan/Hong Kong/Macau	Taipei	2015	2019	8	Worlds 2G + 1P	Pacific Championship Series (merged)
League of Legends SEA Tour	1st (professional)	Southeast Asia	various	2018	2019	8	Worlds 1P	Pacific Championship Series (merged)
League of Legends Circuit Oceania (LCO)	2nd (professional)	(Australia) (New Zealand) Oceania	Online	2023	2024	8	PCS Playoffs	TBD
LoL Secondary Pro League	2nd (professional)	China	Shanghai	2014	2017	16	LPL Promotion	LoL Development League
LJL Challenger Series	2nd (semi-professional)	Japan		2014	2018	6	LJL Promotion	LJL Academy League
LJL Academy League	2nd (academy)	Japan	various	2019	2023	8	N/A	Pacific Challengers League (merged)
League of Legends Championship of The Americas	1st (professional)	Americas	Los Angeles, São Paulo	2025	2025	16	Worlds 3S	Split and reverted back to LCS & CBLOL
Liga Latinoamérica	1st (professional)	Latin America	Mexico City	2019	2024	6	Worlds 1P	
Liga Latinoamérica Norte (LLN) (Eng)	1st (professional)	Latin America North	Mexico City	2014	2018	8	Worlds 1 P	Liga Latinoamérica (merged)
Copa Latinoamérica Sur (CLS) (Eng)	1st (professional)	Latin America South	Santiago	2014	2018	8	Worlds 1 P	Liga Latinoamérica (merged)
Garena Premier League (GPL)	1st (professional)	(Taiwan) (Hong Kong) (Macau) (ASEAN) TW/HK/MO/SEA	various	2012	2018	various	Worlds 1 P	League of Legends SEA Tour
Thailand Pro League (TPL)	2nd (semi-professional)	Thailand		2014	2018	8	GPL Qualification	LoL SEA Tour Thailand qualifier
Singapore Legends Series (SLS)	2nd (semi-professional)	Singapore		2013	2018	8	GPL Qualification	LoL SEA Tour SG/MY qualifier
LoL Championship Malaysia (LCM)	2nd (semi-professional)	Malaysia		2013	2018	8	GPL Qualification	LoL SEA Tour SG/MY qualifier
Pro Gaming Series (PGS)	2nd (semi-professional)	Philippines		2014	2018	8	GPL Qualification	LoL SEA Tour Philippines qualifier
LoL Garuda Series (LGS)	2nd (semi-professional)	Indonesia		2014	2018	8	GPL Qualification	LoL SEA Tour Indonesia qualifier
North America League of Legends Challenger Series	2nd (semi-professional)	(United States) (Canada) North America	Los Angeles	2014	2017	6	NA LCS Promotion	LCS Academy League
Europe League of Legends Challenger Series	2nd (semi-professional)	Europe	Berlin	2014	2017	6	EU LCS Promotion	European Masters
International Wildcard Invitational	Qualifier	various	various	2015	2016	8	MSI Qualification	MSI Play-in Stage
International Wildcard tournament/qualifier	Qualifier	various	various	2013	2016	8	Worlds 2G	Worlds Play-in Stage

=== Cancelled ===
Name	Tier	Region	Location	Established	Ended	Size	Qualified for
League of Legends Continental League (LCL)	1st (professional)	Commonwealth of Independent States	Moscow	2016	2022	8	Worlds 1P
LCL Open Cup	Off-season	Commonwealth of Independent States	online	2017	2022	16	
Oceanic Challenger Series	2nd (semi-professional)	(Australia) (New Zealand) Oceania	Sydney	2015	2020	8	OPL Promotion
Elite Challenger Series	2nd (semi-professional)	Taiwan/Hong Kong/Macau	Taipei	2016	2019	8	LMS Promotion
SLTV Challenger League	2nd (semi-professional)	Commonwealth of Independent States	Kyiv	2016	2018	32	LCL Promotion
Garena All-Star	2nd (SEA Qualifier)	Southeast Asia	various	2016	2017	6	Represent for SEA at All-Star
NiceGameTV League of Legends Battle	2nd (mixed)	South Korea	Seoul	2012	2014	16+12	
Garena Talk Talk League	2nd (amateur)	Taiwan/Hong Kong/Macau	Online	2013		8	
Tencent Games Arena Hero of Cities	3rd (amateur cup)	China	Taicang	2011	2017	29–32	
International Wildcard All-Star	Qualifier	various	various	2015	2016	8	All-Star Qualification

== Other tournaments ==
"Established" and "ended" refers to the years the tournament hosted a League of Legends tournament, not necessarily the years the competition itself was held.

Name	Region	Type	Location	Established	Ended	Size	Latest Champion
Asian Games	Asia	Competitive	various	2018		no limit	South Korea
Southeast Asian Games	Southeast Asia	Competitive	various	2021		6	Vietnam
Asian Indoor and Martial Arts Games	Asia	Competitive	various	2013	2013	4	South Korea
IESF Esports World Championship	Worldwide	Competitive	various	2013	2018	26	South Korea
IGN Pro League	United States	Competitive	various	2011	2012	8–16	(China) Team WE
Intel Extreme Masters	Worldwide	Competitive	various	2011	2017	4–8	(Taiwan) Flash Wolves
Major League Gaming	(United States) (Canada) North America	Competitive	various	2011	2013		(United States) FXOpen eSports
Mid-Season Cup	China vs South Korea	Friendly	Shanghai/Seoul	2020	2020	8	(China) Top Esports
Mid-Season Showdown	(Taiwan) (Hong Kong) TW/HK/MO/SEA vs Vietnam	Friendly	Taipei/Hanoi	2020	2020	4	(Hong Kong) Talon Esports
Rift Rivals	Worldwide	Friendly	various	2017	2019	Blue Rift: 6 Red Rift: 12	Blue Rift: (European Union) LEC; Red Rift: (South Korea) LCK
World Cyber Games	Worldwide	Competitive	Rotating final location	2011	2013		(South Korea) CJ Entus Blaze
Esports World Cup	Worldwide	Competitive	various	2024		16	(South Korea) Dplus KIA
Esports Nations Cup	Worldwide	Competitive	various	2026		32	
Asia Invitational	Asia	Friendly	Online	2025		8	(South Korea) FearX
Americas Cup	Americas	Friendly	various	2026		4	(Brazil) Furia

== Collegiate leagues ==
Current name	Region	Established	Size	Latest winner
International College Cup	Worldwide	2016	12	(China) Jimei University
uLoL Campus Series; College Championship	(United States) (Canada) North America	2015	222	(United States) Saint Louis
CSL Junior Varsity 1	(United States) (Canada) North America	2015	221	(Canada) British Columbia B Team
CSL Junior Varsity 2	(United States) (Canada) North America	2015	136	(United States) Penn State Division 3

=== Campus Series conferences ===
Name	Region		Established	Size	Latest winner
uLoL Campus Series North	(United States) (Canada) North America	North	2017	53	(United States) Maryville
uLoL Campus Series South	(United States) (Canada) North America	South	2017	52	(United States) Texas A&M
uLoL Campus Series East	(United States) (Canada) North America	East	2017	66	(Canada) Toronto
uLoL Campus Series West	(United States) (Canada) North America	West	2017	51	(Canada) Simon Fraser
Big Ten	United States		2017	14	Maryland
Peach Belt	United States		2018	12	N/a

== Notes ==
1. Known as the North American League of Legends Championship Series (NA LCS) before 2019, and League of Legends Championship Series from 2019 to 2020.
2. Refers to the United States and Canada. Countries in Central America and the Caribbean competed in the Latin America region.
3. Hosted by ESL Australia, replaced the OPL that was hosted by Riot Games Oceania.
4. Known as the European League of Legends Championship Series (EU LCS) before franchising in 2019, and League of Legends European Championship for Europe region until 2023.
5. Since 2023, the LEC has been divided into three splits which grant championship points to qualify for its Season Finals.
6. Does not include members of the Commonwealth of Independent States, nor the Baltic States.
7. Refers to the People's Republic of China a.k.a. Mainland China, and does not include Hong Kong and Macau. Although players from Hong Kong and Macau are explicitly accepted as domestic players in the LPL, they de facto share "LCP" residency.
8. Matches of the LPL are played across seven studios owned by different esports organizations, located in Beijing, Shanghai, Chengdu, Chongqing, Hangzhou and Xi'an.
9. Merger of the League of Legends Master Series (LMS) and the League of Legends SEA Tour (LST) into a single league.
10. Formerly known as the League of Legends Nova League and served as the second tier league below Garena Premier League in 2014.
11. Merger of the Liga Latinoamérica Norte (LLN) and the Copa Latinoamérica Sur (CLS).
12. Refers to Hispanic America.
13. Merger of the League Championship Series (LCS), Liga Latinoamérica (LLA) and Campeonato Brasileiro de League of Legends (CBLOL).
14. 1 team from each of the LTA's conferences (North and South) qualifies for the Mid-Season Invitational.
15. Refers to the league established in 2025 that can promote teams to the CBLOL.
16. Not withstanding the actual Commonwealth of Independent States, all post-Soviet players, including those from the Baltic States, are explicitly regarded as domestic players. The region has also been referred to as the "CIS and Baltic States".
17. Refers to most countries of the Arab League.
18. Hosted by GAMERS_X, replaced the Ultraliga that was hosted by Polsat Games.
19. Refers to Mexico, Colombia, Ecuador, Peru, Venezuela, Puerto Rico and all countries in Central America and the Caribbean.
20. Refers to Argentina, Bolivia, Chile, Paraguay and Uruguay.
21. Replaced the Garena Premier League (GPL) prior to the start of the 2018 summer season.
22. The PCS' definition of Southeast Asia extends only to teams from the following countries which host LoL servers: Indonesia, Malaysia, Philippines, Singapore and Thailand. However, players from Brunei, Cambodia, Laos, Myanmar, and Timor-Leste are also considered PCS players.
23. The LCP's definition of Asia-Pacific extends only to teams from the following countries which host LoL servers: Taiwan, Vietnam, Japan, Indonesia, Malaysia, Philippines, Singapore, Thailand and Australia. However, players from all Asian and Oceanian nations except Mainland China, South Korea, and the Middle East (being a part of EMEA) are also considered LCP players.
24. Became a separate region independent from the rest of Southeast Asia in 2018.
25. Consists of semi-professional and amateur teams; losing professional teams from OnGameNet (predecessor of League of Legends Champions Korea) also participate.
26. Included Taiwan, Hong Kong, Macau before 2015 and Vietnam before 2018
27. Formerly called "The Legends Circuit Malaysia" and served as a second tier league below the Garena Premier League.
28. Formerly called "The Legends Circuit Singapore" and served as a second tier league below the Garena Premier League.
29. Served as the Tier 1 league before the 2013 spring season, then second tier before the 2014 spring season.
30. The size of this tournament does not include the regional or online stages, only the finals.
31. "Emerging regions", refers to any region without an automatic spot in the World Championship main event, that is, excluding China, South Korea, North America, Europe and Taiwan/Hong Kong/Macau. Champions of leagues marked with "IWT" participated in the IWC.
32. Cancelled due to 2022 Russian invasion of Ukraine.
