= Berjaya Dragons =

Malaysian esports organisation

- Short name: BJD
- Divisions: League of Legends; League of Legends: Wild Rift
- Founded: 17 January 2020
- Folded: 16 November 2021
- Based in: Kuala Lumpur, Malaysia
- Manager: Lin Shinn-yeu
- Parent group: Berjaya Corporation
- Motto: "Pride of Malaysia"

Berjaya Dragons was a Malaysian esports organisation which had teams competing in League of Legends and League of Legends: Wild Rift. Its League of Legends team competed in the Pacific Championship Series (PCS), the top-level league for the game in Taiwan, Hong Kong, Macau, and Southeast Asia.

Berjaya Dragons was acquired by rival esports organisation SEM9 on 16 November 2021. Their League of Legends and League of Legends: Wild Rift rosters were subsequently merged.

== League of Legends ==
=== History ===
Berjaya Dragons was announced as the tenth and final team to join the PCS on 17 January 2020. On 1 February, the team revealed their ten-man roster, although only six players—Azhi, Enso, Maoan, Minji, K2, and Kagame—participated in their inaugural split.

Berjaya Dragons finished fourth in the 2020 PCS Spring regular season, qualifying for the first round of playoffs in the winners' bracket. The team defeated Alpha Esports in the first round but lost to Machi Esports in the second, bumping them down to the losers' bracket, where they were eliminated from playoffs by Hong Kong Attitude.

=== Tournament results ===
Placement	Event	Final result (W–L)
4th	2020 PCS Spring Split	10–8
5th–6th	2020 PCS Spring Playoffs	0–2 (against Hong Kong Attitude)
8th	2020 PCS Summer Split	6–12
7th	2021 PCS Spring Split	6–12
5th–6th	2021 PCS Spring Playoffs	0–3 (against J Team)
