= BYG =

BYG can refer to:

- Bang Yong Guk, acronym and stage name of the South Korean rapper.
- Beyond Gaming, a Taiwanese former professional League of Legends team
- BYG Records, French record label
- BYG•DTU, the Department of Civil Engineering at the Technical University of Denmark.
