= G-Rex =

G-Rex may refer to:

- G-Rex Championship, a Japanese wrestling championship
- G-Rex Gaming, a defunct Hong Kong esports organisation
