= Intel Extreme Masters Season IX =

- Date: July 16, 2014–March 15, 2015
- Location: Katowice, Silesian Voivodeship, Poland
- Type: Esports
- Theme: Tournament
- Patrons: Intel, BenQ, Kingston HyperX, GIGABYTE, ROCCAT
- Organised by: Electronic Sports League
- Total prize money: c. US$545,000
- Official game titles: Hearthstone: Heroes of Warcraft; League of Legends; StarCraft II: Heart of the Swarm
- Champions: LoL: Team SoloMid; SC2: Joo "Zest" Sung-wook
- Website: Official website

Intel Extreme Masters Season IX was the ninth season of Intel Extreme Masters competitions organized by Electronic Sports League, and took place between July 2014 and March 2015. The season included five stops in different cities around the world acting as qualifiers before culminating in the World Championship in Katowice, Poland. The featured games were League of Legends by Riot Games and StarCraft II: Heart of the Swarm, as well as one competition of Hearthstone: Heroes of Warcraft, both by Blizzard Entertainment.

== Shenzhen ==
Intel Extreme Masters Shenzhen was the opening event of Season IX, and took place between July 16–20 at the Shenzhen Cartoon and Animation Festival in Shenzhen, China. The event featured three games: StarCraft II, League of Legends, and Hearthstone: Heroes of Warcraft in its sole Intel Extreme Masters appearance of the season. The prize pools consisted of US$25,000, US$5,000 and US$10,000 respectively, as well as 4,000 StarCraft II World Championship Series (WCS) points spread among the participants based on their placing.

=== Hearthstone: Heroes of Warcraft ===
Place	Player	Prize money
1st	(Hong Kong) Amaz	$4,000
2nd	(Taiwan) Azeri	$2,000
3rd–4th	(Hong Kong) Jeanno	$1,000
3rd–4th	(Romania) RDU	$1,000
5–8th	(Hong Kong) JackyChan	$500
5–8th	(United States) MaSsan	$500
5–8th	(United States) StrifeCro	$500
5–8th	(China) XiaoSoul	$500

=== League of Legends ===
Place	Team	Prize money
1st	Team WE	$3,500
2nd	EDward Gaming	$1,500

=== StarCraft II ===
Place	Player	Prize money
1st	(South Korea) TaeJa	$10,000
2nd	(South Korea) Solar	$4,000
3rd–4th	(South Korea) Jaedong	$2,000
3rd–4th	(China) Jim	$2,000
5–8th	(South Korea) INnoVation	$1,000
5–8th	(South Korea) San	$1,000
5–8th	(Denmark) Snute	$1,000
5–8th	(South Korea) Zest	$1,000

Source: Intel Extreme Masters

== Toronto ==
=== StarCraft II ===
Place	Player	Prize money
1st	(South Korea) Flash	$10,000
2nd	(South Korea) Zest	$4,000
3rd–4th	(South Korea) Life	$2,000
3rd–4th	(South Korea) TaeJa	$2,000
5–8th	(South Korea) First	$1,000
5–8th	(Denmark) Snute	$1,000
5–8th	(South Korea) viOLet	$1,000
5–8th	(South Korea) YoDa	$1,000

Source: Intel Extreme Masters

== San Jose ==
=== League of Legends ===
Place	Team	Prize money
1st	Cloud9	$25,000
2nd	Unicorns of Love	$11,000
3rd–4th	Alliance	$5,000
3rd–4th	Team SoloMid	$5,000
5–6th	Lyon Gaming	$2,000
5–6th	paiN Gaming	$2,000

=== StarCraft II ===
Place	Player	Prize money
1st	(South Korea) herO	$10,000
2nd	(South Korea) Rain	$4,000
3rd–4th	(South Korea) Bomber	$2,000
3rd–4th	(South Korea) Jaedong	$2,000
5–8th	(South Korea) ForGG	$1,000
5–8th	(South Korea) GuMiho	$1,000
5–8th	(South Korea) Revival	$1,000
5–8th	(Denmark) Snute	$1,000

Source: Intel Extreme Masters

== Cologne ==
=== League of Legends ===
Place	Team	Prize money
1st	Gambit Gaming	$12,500
2nd	Counter Logic Gaming	$6,500
3rd–4th	Team Dignitas	$3,500
3rd–4th	Team ROCCAT	$3,500
5–6th	Aces High	$2,000
5–6th	Dolphins of Wall Street	$2,000

Source: Intel Extreme Masters

== Taipei ==
=== League of Legends ===
Place	Team	Prize money
1st	yoe Flash Wolves	$25,000
2nd	Taipei Assassins	$11,000
3rd–4th	ahq e-Sports Club	$5,000
3rd–4th	Saigon Jokers	$5,000
5–6th	Avant Garde	$2,000
5–6th	Bangkok Titans	$2,000

=== StarCraft II ===
Place	Player	Prize money
1st	(South Korea) Life	$10,000
2nd	(South Korea) Maru	$4,000
3rd–4th	(South Korea) PartinG	$2,000
3rd–4th	(South Korea) Soulkey	$2,000
5–8th	(South Korea) Classic	$1,000
5–8th	(South Korea) herO	$1,000
5–8th	(South Korea) HyuN	$1,000
5–8th	(South Korea) Rain	$1,000

Source: Intel Extreme Masters

== World Championship – Katowice ==
=== League of Legends ===
Place	Team	Prize money
1st	Team SoloMid	$108,414
2nd	Team WE	$30,000
3rd–4th	GE Tigers	$15,000
3rd–4th	yoe Flash Wolves	$15,000
5–6th	CJ Entus	$5,000
5–6th	SK Gaming	$5,000
7–8th	Cloud9	$2,500
7–8th	Gambit Gaming	$2,500

=== StarCraft II ===
Place	Player	Prize money
1st	(South Korea) Zest	$66,707
2nd	(South Korea) Trap	$15,000
3rd–4th	(South Korea) BByong	$7,500
3rd–4th	(South Korea) Dark	$7,500
5–8th	(South Korea) FanTaSy	$3,000
5–8th	(South Korea) herO	$3,000
5–8th	(South Korea) INnoVation	$3,000
5–8th	(South Korea) Maru	$3,000
9–16th	(South Korea) Cure	$1,000
9–16th	(South Korea) Flash	$1,000
9–16th	(South Korea) Hydra	$1,000
9–16th	(South Korea) Life	$1,000
9–16th	(South Korea) Patience	$1,000
9–16th	(South Korea) Rain	$1,000
9–16th	(South Korea) Solar	$1,000
9–16th	(South Korea) TaeJa	$1,000

Source: Intel Extreme Masters
