= Pacific Championship Series =

Esports league in Taiwan, Hong Kong, and Macau

- Formerly: LMS and LST
- Game: League of Legends
- Founded: 19 December 2019
- First season: Spring 2020
- Organising body: Riot Games; Carry International
- No. of teams: 8
- Most recent champion: CTBC Flying Oyster Academy (2nd title)
- Most titles: PSG Talon (8 titles)
- Sponsor: Chunghwa Telecom
- Promotion to: League of Legends Championship Pacific
- Relegation to: Pacific Challengers League

Pacific Championship Series
- Traditional Chinese: 英雄聯盟太平洋職業聯賽
- Simplified Chinese: 英雄联盟太平洋职业联赛
- Literal meaning: League of Legends Pacific Professional League
Transcriptions
Standard Mandarin
- Hanyu Pinyin: Yīngxióng Liánméng Tàipíngyáng Zhíyè Liánsài
Yue: Cantonese
- Yale Romanization: Yīnghùhng Lyùhnmàhng Taaipìhngyèuhng Jīkyihp Lyùhnchoi
- Jyutping: Jing^{1}hung^{4} Lyun^{4}mang^{4} Taai^{3}ping^{4}joeng^{4} Zik^{1}jip^{6} Lyun^{4}coi^{3}

The Pacific Championship Series (PCS) is a professional esports league for League of Legends teams competing in Taiwan, Hong Kong, and Macau. It is a tier-two league in the League of Legends competitive ecosystem, with a path to promotion to the tier-one League of Legends Championship Pacific (LCP).

Riot Games, the game's developer, created the league in 2019. This followed an announcement by Garena – the game's distributor in Taiwan, Hong Kong, Macau, and Southeast Asia – that it planned to merge the League of Legends Master Series (LMS) and League of Legends SEA Tour (LST) into a single tournament jointly run with Riot Games.

Initially, ten teams competed in the regular season, but this was reduced to eight teams in the 2024 spring season and finally seven in the 2024 summer season. In its final year of tier-one competition, the top six teams from the PCS regular season advanced to the playoffs and were joined by the top three teams from Japan and the top two teams from Oceania. Oceania became a part of the PCS region in 2022, with the League of Legends Circuit Oceania (LCO) being downgraded to a tier-two league secondary to the PCS. Japan followed suit the next year, with the League of Legends Japan League being similarly downgraded and integrated into the PCS.

Riot Games announced in 2024 that the LCP would replace the PCS as the Asia-Pacific's tier-one league from 2025 onward. The PCS would become a domestic league for teams in Taiwan, Hong Kong, and Macau – like its predecessor the LMS – and, along with the LJL and VCS, would join the LCO as a tier-two league with a path to promotion to the LCP. Additionally, a wildcard tournament would be held for teams in Southeast Asia, excluding Vietnam, for a chance to qualify for the LCP.

== History ==
=== Prior to the PCS ===
The first professional esports league for League of Legends players in Taiwan, Hong Kong, Macau, and Southeast Asia was the Garena Premier League (GPL), which ran from 2012 to mid-2018. Teams from Taiwan, Hong Kong, and Macau were given their own league, the League of Legends Master Series (LMS), in late 2014. Three years later, the Vietnam Championship Series (VCS) was upgraded to a Tier 1 tournament and Vietnam became its own competitive region, separate from the rest of Southeast Asia. The GPL was rebranded as the League of Legends SEA Tour (LST) in mid-2018.

=== Formation ===
Garena announced on 25 September 2019 that it intended to merge the LMS and LST into a single league, the details of which would be released near the end of the year. On 19 December, Riot Games announced the name of the new league, the Pacific Championship Series (PCS), and a list of nine of the ten teams that would compete in it. Berjaya Dragons was announced as the last team joining the PCS on 17 January 2020. Riot Games stated the new league was intended to increase the level of competition in Southeast Asia, Taiwan and Hong Kong, and to create a more engaging experience for fans.

=== Inaugural season ===
The 2020 season was postponed until further notice on 29 January due to the COVID-19 outbreak. It was later announced on 18 February that the 2020 season would officially begin on 29 February.

On 13 February it was announced that G-Rex had disbanded its League of Legends team and forfeited its spot in the PCS as a result of internal restructuring by their parent company Emperor Esports Stars. Five days later, Machi Esports was announced as G-Rex's replacement.

=== Expansion ===
Riot Games announced on 18 November 2022 that the PCS would expand to include Oceania, beginning in 2023. Two major changes were made: The winners of the League of Legends Circuit Oceania would no longer directly qualify for the Mid-Season Invitational (MSI) and the World Championship (Worlds). Instead, the LCO's top two teams would have to compete in the PCS playoffs to gain a spot. Additionally, LCO players would have their residencies changed from "Oceania" to "PCS", meaning they would no longer take import slots on PCS teams, and vice versa.

On 26 November 2023, Riot Games announced that the League of Legends Japan League would join the PCS playoffs in a similar manner to the LCO. From 2024 onwards, the top three teams from the LJL would have to compete in the PCS playoffs for a spot at MSI and Worlds. Additionally, LJL players would have their residencies changed from "Japan" to "PCS".

== Teams ==
At the beginning, ten teams were selected by Riot Games as permanent franchise partners of the PCS. However, it was announced on 4 August 2020 that a promotion tournament would be introduced for the 2021 season to promote regional competitiveness.

After the PCS became a tier-two league in 2025, partner teams in the tier-one LCP began to field academy teams in the PCS. Academy teams are ineligible for promotion to the LCP or relegation to a tier-three regional league.

=== 2026 season ===
Starting from the 2026 season, only teams that qualify for the main tournament (Spring or Summer of knockout stage) will be included.

Team	Joined
CFO Academy (CFO.A) (Note: Academy team of CTBC Flying Oyster, which competes in the League of Legends Championship Pacific.)	23 January 2025
Equinox Core (EQX)	21 April 2026
Frank Esports (FAK)	28 January 2022
Ground Zero Academy (GZ.A)	23 April 2026
One Round Specialists (ORS)	21 April 2026
Shadow Keepers Esports (SHKP)	21 April 2026
SillySilly Gaming (SSG)	8 April 2026
Viper Night Raider (VNR)	21 April 2026
wangting (WT)	19 March 2025
Xu Ji Basalt (XJB)	21 April 2026

=== Former teams ===
Team	Joined	Left	Reason
G-Rex	19 December 2019	13 February 2020	Withdrew (Note: Withdrew before the start of their inaugural season.)
Resurgence	19 December 2019	8 September 2020	Relegated
ahq eSports Club	19 December 2019	26 January 2021	Withdrew
Nova Esports	19 December 2019	5 February 2021	Withdrew
Berjaya Dragons	17 January 2020	16 November 2021	Withdrew
Hong Kong Attitude	19 December 2019	24 November 2021	Withdrew
BOOM Esports	5 February 2021	28 January 2022	Withdrew
Liyab Esports	19 December 2019	28 January 2022	Withdrew
Machi Esports	18 February 2020	28 January 2022	Withdrew
SEM9	16 November 2021	3 December 2022	Withdrew
Meta Falcon Team	28 January 2022	12 January 2023	Withdrew
Dewish Team (Note: Dewish Team was known as Alpha Esports from 2019 to 2021, and Hurricane Gaming in 2022.)	19 December 2019	7 October 2023	Relegated
Impunity Esports	8 September 2020	8 October 2023	Relegated
Nate9527	6 October 2023	19 January 2024	Withdrew
PSG Talon Academy	7 October 2023	19 January 2024	Withdrew (Note: Academy teams cannot be promoted to a league where their parent organisation is competing. PSG Talon was unable to sell its academy team's PCS spot before the start of the 2024 season.)
Beyond Gaming	26 January 2021	20 April 2024	Withdrew
J Team	19 December 2019	1 November 2024	Withdrew
Hungkuang Falcon	23 January 2025	19 March 2025	Relegated
PSG Talon (Note: PSG Talon was formed from a merger between Talon Esports and PSG Esports on 18 June 2020.) (Note: PSG Talon was previously based in Hong Kong but moved to Taiwan in 2023.)	19 December 2019	3 November 2024	Promoted (Note: Became a partner team of the League of Legends Championship Pacific.)
CTBC Flying Oyster	27 January 2022	3 November 2024	Promoted
Deep Cross Gaming	28 January 2022	3 October 2025	Promoted (Note: Won the free-for-all bracket of the 2026 League of Legends Championship Pacific promotion series.)
PSG Talon Academy	23 January 2025	17 November 2025	Removed
Ground Zero Gaming (Note: Ground Zero Gaming's League of Legends team was previously based in Australia and competed in the League of Legends Circuit Oceania before moving to Taiwan in 2025.)	23 January 2025	22 December 2025	Promoted (Note: On 22 December 2025, Ground Zero Gaming was promoted to the League of Legends Championship Pacific for the 2026 season as a direct replacement for PSG Talon, which was removed due to financial issues.)
Hell Pigs	12 January 2023	Before 2026 Spring	Withdrew
West Point Esports (Note: West Point Esports is a Philippine organisation, but its League of Legends team is based in Taiwan.) (Note: West Point Esports was partnered with SEM9 and competed as SEM9 WPE from 17 January 2023 to 15 June 2023.)	17 January 2023	Before 2026 Spring	Withdrew

== Results ==
Year	Split	Champions	Runners-up	Third-place
Tier 1 tournament (2020–2024)
2020	Spring	Talon Esports	Machi Esports	ahq eSports Club
2020	Summer	Machi Esports	PSG Talon	J Team
2021	Spring	PSG Talon	Beyond Gaming	Machi Esports
2021	Summer	PSG Talon	Beyond Gaming	J Team
2022	Spring	PSG Talon	CTBC Flying Oyster	J Team
2022	Summer	CTBC Flying Oyster	Beyond Gaming	PSG Talon
2023	Spring	PSG Talon	Frank Esports	CTBC Flying Oyster
2023	Summer	PSG Talon	CTBC Flying Oyster	Beyond Gaming
2024	Spring	PSG Talon	SoftBank Hawks	CTBC Flying Oyster
2024	Summer	PSG Talon	SoftBank Hawks	Frank Esports
Tier 2 tournament (2025–present)
2025	Split 1	Deep Cross Gaming	West Point Esports	Frank Esports
2025	Split 2	Deep Cross Gaming	Frank Esports	West Point Esports
2025	Split 3	Deep Cross Gaming	Frank Esports	PSG Talon Academy
2026	Spring	CTBC Flying Oyster Academy	Frank Esports	SillySilly Gaming
2026	Summer	CTBC Flying Oyster Academy	Frank Esports	SillySilly Gaming

== Number of top three finishes ==
denotes a team, country or region that no longer competes in the PCS.

=== By team ===
Pos	Team	1st place, gold medalist(s)	2nd place, silver medalist(s)	3rd place, bronze medalist(s)	T
1.	PSG Talon	8	1	1	10
2.	Deep Cross Gaming	3	0	0	3
3.	CTBC Flying Oyster Academy	2	0	0	2
4.	CTBC Flying Oyster	1	2	2	5
5.	Machi Esports	1	1	1	3
6.	Frank Esports	0	5	2	7
7.	Beyond Gaming	0	3	1	4
8.	SoftBank Hawks	0	2	0	2
9.	West Point Esports	0	1	1	2
10.	J Team	0	0	3	3
11.	SillySilly Gaming	0	0	2	2
12.	ahq eSports Club	0	0	1	1
12.	PSG Talon Academy	0	0	1	1

=== By country or region ===
Pos	Country / Region	1st place, gold medalist(s)	2nd place, silver medalist(s)	3rd place, bronze medalist(s)	T
1.	Taiwan (Note: The PCS refers to Taiwan as "Taipei" in its official publications.)	11	7	12	30
2.	Hong Kong	4	6	3	13
3.	Japan	0	2	0	2
