= SEM9 =

Malaysian esports organisation

- Short name: S9
- Divisions: Call of Duty: Mobile; PUBG Mobile; League of Legends; League of Legends: Wild Rift
- Founded: 14 January 2020
- Based in: Kuala Lumpur, Malaysia
- CEO: Kevin Wong Yew Joon
- Partners: Razer Gold GANK
- Main sponsor: SEAGM
- Website: www.sem9.gg

SEM9 (Note: Previous names include Wulf Esports, GANK.FTY, Yoodo.GANK, and SEM9.GANK) is a professional esports organisation based in Kuala Lumpur, Malaysia. It was founded on 14 January 2020 by Kevin Wong Yew Joon, its current CEO. It has teams competing in PUBG Mobile, Garena Free Fire, League of Legends, and Sim Racing. It previously had teams competing in Call of Duty: Mobile and League of Legends: Wild Rift. The organisation also operates SEM9 Senai, an esports-themed hotel located in Senai, Johor, Malaysia.

== Call of Duty: Mobile ==
SEM9 finished third at the COD Mobile Championship 2021: Garena qualifier.

== League of Legends ==
=== History ===
SEM9 acquired Berjaya Dragons' spot in the Pacific Championship Series (PCS) on 16 November 2021. SEM9's inaugural roster was the first all-Malaysian team to compete in the PCS.

SEM9 finished last (tenth) in the 2022 PCS Spring regular season with a 0–18 record, becoming the first team in PCS history to end a split winless.

== PUBG Mobile ==
SEM9's PUBG Mobile team is known as SEM9.GANK. Its current roster consists of ManParang (in-game leader), Draxx (sniper), Bravo (fragger), Putra (rusher) and the youngest member Dep (rusher).

== Other ventures ==
SEM9 operates SEM9 Senai, an esports-themed hotel located near Senai International Airport, in Senai, Johor, Malaysia. It is Southeast Asia's first esports-themed hotel.

On 16 March 2022, SEM9 introduced 99LIVES, a collection of cat-themed non-fungible tokens.
