= Nova Esports =

Esports organisation based in Hong Kong

- Divisions: League of Legends: Wild Rift; Game for Peace; Call of Duty: Mobile; Clash Royale; Brawl Stars; FIFA 20
- Founded: 2016
- Location: Hong Kong
- President: Zheng Dinggang
- CEO: Oktay Olcen; Ms. Ritina (China)
- Partners: DXRacer; Trovo; Huya Live
- Website: Official website

Nova Esports is a professional esports organisation based in Hong Kong. It was founded in September 2016. Nova Esports currently fields players in League of Legends: Wild Rift, Game for Peace,Call of Duty: Mobile, Clash Royale, Brawl Stars, Honor of Kings, Valorant, and FIFA 20.

Both the 2020 and 2021 PUBG Mobile Global Championships (PMGC) were won by Nova Esports' PUBG Mobile / Game for Peace squad, and they also won the Peace Eite Championship (PEC) twice.

RoyaleClan (video games)|clan]] created in May 2016 by Anthony Yeung and his management team of Francis, Trevor, Jack, Niro and Richard. Later Oktay, Matthew and Steven joined the team. In September 2016 Nova was established as an esports organisation.

In 2020 Nova Esports International Limited was acquired by the Hong Kong listed company Imperium Group Global Holdings Limited.

In October 2019, Nova Esports won the first-ever Clash of Clans World Championships held in Hamburg, Germany. The team earned $250,000 as their winning prize.

Nova Esports became the first Brawl Stars world champion in November 2019. Nova Esports won the Brawl Stars World Finals 2019 held in Busan, South Korea.

In January 2021 Nova Esports' Game for Peace (Chinese version of PUBG Mobile) team won the PUBG Mobile Global Championship (PMGC) 2020, held in Dubai, UAE in online mode. The team won a total prize of $700,000.

In August 2023, Nova Esports' Pubg Mobile Team disbanded on behalf of players switching to PEL (Chinese version of Pubg Mobile's League) or switching or leaving to join another team. For example, a player like Xifan, who switched to the Chinese esports team, but then switched to a Singaporean esports team, known as N Hyper Esports.

== Current divisions ==
=== Valorant ===
==== Roster ====
Nova Esports Valorant roster
Players
Coaches

Handle	Name	Nationality
cb	Wang Qingchuan	China
o0o0o	Ye Xiaodong	China
OBONE	Chen Yijie	China
GuanG	Guang Honglin	China
Swerl	Mohammad Ali Kobraee	Iran
Ezeir	Zhao Zejun	China
monk	Wang Haoyu	China

Head coach

Shao "24K" Yubo

Assistant coach(es)

Han "fore" Qibing

Legend:
- (I) Inactive
- (S) Suspended
- Substitute
- (injured) Injury / Illness

Roster

=== League of Legends: Wild Rift ===
Before the global release of the game, Nova Esports, on 6 November 2020, announced that they will be hiring a League of Legends: Wild Rift roster which will be based in China and Europe.

On 9 July 2022, Nova Esports was crowned the first Wild Rift Global Icons Championship 2022 champions. Nova Esports defeated J Team by a score of 4-0 in Best of 7. The team won a total prize of $640,000.

==== Roster ====
Nova Esports League of Legends roster
Players
Coaches

Role	Handle	Name	Nationality
Baron	Y1ze	Zhang yize	China
Jungle	Long	An Xulong	China
Mid	Nian	Wei Haojin	China
Dragon	Remake	Ma zhengyue	China
Support	Yami	Tang Zhiqang	China

Head coach

- Vacant

Legend:
- (I) Inactive
- (S) Suspended
- Substitute
- (injured) Injury / Illness

Roster updated 11 July 2023.

=== Game for Peace ===
On 9 July 2020, Nova Esports, in partnership with Chinese team X-Quest F, revealed their roster for Game for Peace, the Chinese version of PUBG Mobile, named Nova XQF.

On 23 August 2020, Nova XQF won the Peacekeeper Elite League (PEL) Season 2 and won over $140,000.

On 26 January 2021, Nova XQF won the PUBG Mobile Global Championship (PMGC) 2020. The team won a total prize of $700,000. Nova's Order (56 Kills) and Paraboy (44 Kills) were the second and third-highest fraggers of the tournament respectively.

On 23 January 2022 Nova Esports won the PUBG Mobile Global Championship(PMGC) 2021. Team won a total prize of $1.53 Million.

==== Roster ====
Nova Esports Nova XQF Game for Peace roster
Players
Coaches

Handle	Name	Nationality
Coolboy	Zeng Ronghua	China
Loongskr	Yong Ang	Malaysia
Order	Cheng Zehai	China
梦杨	Cheng Yang	China
qc	Xu Jiajun	China
Frozen	Zhou Yuchao	China

Head coach

Xiaorong

Legend:
- (I) Inactive
- (S) Suspended
- Substitute
- (injured) Injury / Illness

Roster updated 1 October 2024.

=== Call of Duty: Mobile ===
Nova Esports also has a Call of Duty: Mobile roster. This roster is based in Europe and consists of European players.

==== Roster ====
Nova Esports Call of Duty: Mobile roster
Players
Coaches

Handle	Name	Nationality
Neil	Geneil Rae Dacanay	Philippines
SaTuRnZz	Samuel Navarro	Spain
vere	Faith Camgöz	Germany
Creed	Serhat Atilla	Netherlands
cZSpy	Petr Karásek	Czech Republic
Inferno	Ikraam Shah	United Kingdom

Head coach

Anissa

Legend:
- (I) Inactive
- (S) Suspended
- Substitute
- (injured) Injury / Illness

Roster updated 5 May 2022.

=== Clash Royale ===
Chenghui "Lciop" Huang represents Nova Esports in Clash Royale competitions. Lciop is Chinese.

On 1 November 2020, Nova Esports have won the Clash Royale League (CRL) East fall season 2020 and won prize $120,000. Lciop bagged the award for the Most Valuable Player (MVP) of the tournament.

== Former divisions ==
=== PUBG Mobile ===
In June 2020, Nova Esports partnered with Indian eSports organisation GodLike's PUBG Mobile team. The team was named "Nova × GodLike" and participated in PUBG Mobile World League (PMWL) Eastern Division under this banner.

The partnership ended in September 2020 when PUBG Mobile was banned in India by the Government of India.

Alongside Game for Peace, Nova Esports also revealed their PUBG Mobile roster consisting of players from different countries although the team disbanded about 2 years after.

Nova Esports placed second in the league stage of PUBG Mobile Pro League (PMPL) North America with a total of 497 points.

This roster is no longer available because of the team disbanding.
