= 2020 Mid-Season Streamathon =

League of Legends esports event

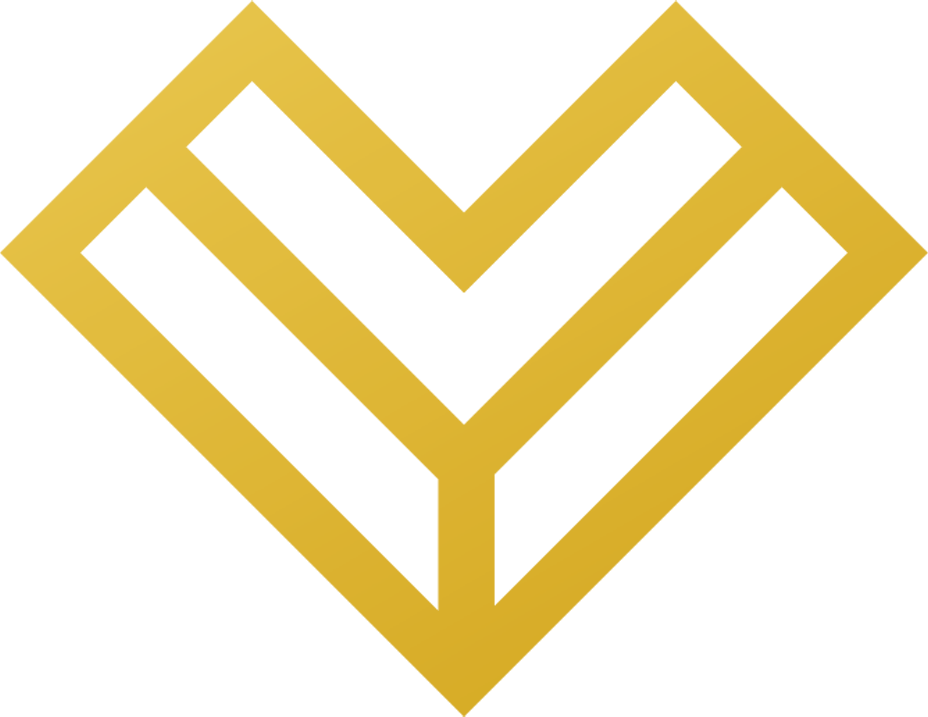
- Date: 29–31 May 2020
- Location: Global
- Type: Live stream event
- Organised by: Riot Games

The 2020 Mid-Season Streamathon was an esports live stream event hosted by Riot Games, featuring international League of Legends competitions and exhibition matches from multiple regions. It was the replacement for the 2020 Mid-Season Invitational, which was cancelled due to the global COVID-19 pandemic. The primary goal of the event was to raise money for COVID-19 relief efforts.

== Mid-Season Cup ==
Mid-Season Cup
- 2020

Tournament information
- Sport: League of Legends
- Dates: 28–31 May
- Host: Riot Games
- Venue: LoL Park, Seoul; LPL Arena, Shanghai
- Teams: 8
- Purse: US$600,000

Final positions
- Champions: Top Esports
- Runner-up: FunPlus Phoenix

The 2020 Mid-Season Cup was an international tournament featuring the top four teams from the spring season of the LCK (South Korea) and LPL (China). Games are played online with artificially standardized ping to ensure competitive integrity. Players compete onsite at their respective league's home arenas, but without a live audience present. The tournament's total prize pool was US$600,000.

=== Participants ===
LCK

- T1
- Gen.G
- DragonX
- DAMWON Gaming

LPL

- JD Gaming
- Top Esports
- FunPlus Phoenix
- Invictus Gaming

=== Group stage ===
- Format: Single round robin, best-of-one

Group A

Pos	Team	W	L	Pts
1	FunPlus Phoenix	2	1	1
2	Top Esports	2	1	1
3	DAMWON Gaming	1	2	−1
4	T1	1	2	−1

Group B

Pos	Team	W	L	Pts
1	Gen.G	2	1	1
2	JD Gaming	2	1	1
3	DragonX	2	1	1
4	Invictus Gaming	0	3	−3

Tiebreakers

Group B tiebreaker (Match 1)			Group B tiebreaker (Match 2)
			1	DragonX	L
2	DragonX	L		JD Gaming	W
3	Gen.G	W

=== Knockout stage ===
- Format: Best-of-five

Semifinals
JD Gaming	1
FunPlus Phoenix	3
Top Esports	3
Gen.G	0

Finals
FunPlus Phoenix	1
Top Esports	3

=== Ranking ===
Place	Team	Prize (USD)	Prize share
1st	Top Esports	$240,000	40%
2nd	FunPlus Phoenix	$120,000	20%
3rd–4th	JD Gaming	$60,000	10%
3rd–4th	Gen.G	$60,000	10%
5th–6th	DAMWON Gaming	$40,000	6.67%
5th–6th	DragonX	$40,000	6.67%
7th–8th	T1	$20,000	3.33%
7th–8th	Invictus Gaming	$20,000	3.33%

== Mid-Season Showdown ==
Mid-Season Showdown
- 2020
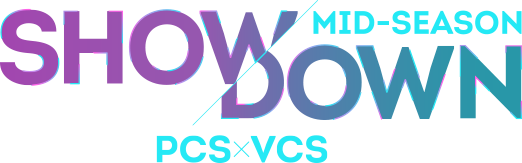

Tournament information
- Sport: League of Legends
- Dates: 27–30 May
- Host(s): Riot Games; FunPlus Esports; Garena
- Teams: 4

Final positions
- Champions: Talon Esports
- Runner-up: Team Flash

The 2020 Mid-Season Showdown was an international tournament featuring the top two teams from the spring season of the VCS (Vietnam) and PCS (Taiwan, Hong Kong, Macau, and Southeast Asia; excluding Vietnam). Games are played online with artificially standardized ping to ensure competitive integrity.

=== Participants ===
PCS

- Talon Esports
- Machi Esports

VCS

- Team Flash
- GAM Esports

=== Group stage ===
- Format: Double round robin, best-of-one

Pos	Team	W	L	Pts
1	Talon Esports	5	1	4
2	Machi Esports	4	2	2
3	Team Flash	2	4	−2
4	GAM Esports	1	5	−4

=== Knockout stage ===
- Format: Best-of-five

Semifinals		Finals
		Talon Esports	3
Machi Esports	1	Team Flash	1
Team Flash	3

== EU Face-Off ==
EU Face-Off
- 2020
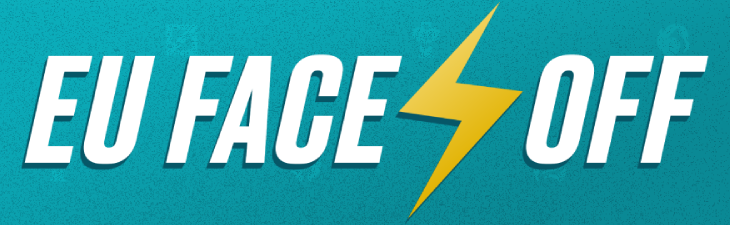

Tournament information
- Sport: League of Legends
- Dates: 30–31 May
- Host: Riot Games
- Venue: Riot Games Studio, Berlin
- Teams: 6

Final positions
- Champions: The French Zoo
- Runner-up: LEC Kings

=== Participants ===
- LEC Kings
- The French Zoo
- German Pingus
- Double Crunch Italy
- Polska Gurom
- ALTOKEKW Españita

=== Group stage ===
- Format: Single round robin, best-of-one

Group A

Pos	Team	W	L	Pts
1	LEC Kings	1	1	0
2	German Pingus	1	1	0
3	ALTOKEKW Españita	1	1	0

Group B

Pos	Team	W	L	Pts
1	The French Zoo	2	0	2
2	Polska Gurom	1	1	0
3	Double Crunch Italy	0	2	−2

=== Knockout stage ===
- Format: Best-of-one

Semifinals
LEC Kings	W
Polska Gurom	L
The French Zoo	W
German Pingus	L

Finals
LEC Kings	L
The French Zoo	W
