= G-Rex Gaming =

Hong Kong esports organisation (2016–2020)

- Short name: G-Rex, GRX
- Divisions: League of Legends; PlayerUnknown's Battlegrounds
- Founded: 12 September 2016 (as Raise Gaming)
- Folded: 13 February 2020
- Team history: Raise Gaming (2016–2017); G-Rex (2017–2020)
- Based in: Hong Kong
- Owner: Albert Yeung
- Parent group: Emperor Esports Stars

G-Rex Gaming, often known simply as G-Rex, was a Hong Kong–based esports organisation owned by Emperor Esports Stars, a subsidiary of Emperor Entertainment Group. It began as a League of Legends team named Raise Gaming, which began competing in the tier-two Elite Challengers Series (ECS) and eventually qualified for the tier-one League of Legends Master Series (LMS). The team qualified for the 2018 World Championship after winning that year's LMS Regional Finals.

== History ==
=== As Raise Gaming ===
On 12 September 2016, Dream Catcher Gaming was acquired by former World Champion Kurtis "Toyz" Lau Wai-kin and renamed Raise Gaming. Details regarding the team were kept secret until February 2017, when top laner Hsieh "PK" Yu-ting, jungler Huang "Laba" Zhen-yang, mid laner Yang "Wuji" Chia-yu, bot laner Chen "LilV" Chin-han, and support Lin "Koala" Chih-chiang were announced as the starting roster for the 2017 ECS Spring Split.

Raise Gaming ended the 2017 ECS Spring Split with a dominant 10–4–0 record, placing 1st and qualifying for the 2017 ECS Spring Playoffs. The team defeated ahq Fighter 2–0 in the first round of playoffs, but lost to Team Yetti 2–3 in the finals. However, Raise Gaming's placement still qualified them for the 2017 LMS Summer Promotion tournament, where they defeated eXtreme Gamers 2–0 in the first round but lost to Wayi Spider in the second qualifying round, putting them in the losers bracket. The team faced Team Yetti once again in the bracket's final qualifying round and defeated them with a 3–0 sweep, qualifying for the 2017 LMS Summer Split.

Raise Gaming proved to be a domestic powerhouse during the 2017 LMS Summer Split, placing 2nd (after losing a tiebreaker match for 1st against Flash Wolves) in their inaugural season with a 10–4 record. However, the team lost 1–3 to ahq e-Sports Club in the first round of playoffs and were forced to play in the LMS Regional Finals in order to qualify for that year's World Championship. Unfortunately, Raise Gaming were unable to qualify for the World Championship after losing 0–3 to Hong Kong Attitude in the final qualifying round.

On 15 September 2017, Raise Gaming was purchased by Hong Kong business company Emperor Entertainment Group and renamed to G-Rex.

=== As G-Rex ===
G-Rex retained every player from the starting roster of Raise Gaming except for LilV, who decided to join J Team. On 29 September 2017, G-Rex acquired mid laner Kim "Candy" Seung-ju and bot laner Lee "Stitch" Seung-ju from CJ Entus and Samsung Galaxy respectively. Junglers Anson "Empt2y" Leung Tsz Ho and Wang "baybay" You-chun joined the team to complete the starting roster for the 2018 LMS Spring Split.

G-Rex placed second in the 2018 LMS Spring Split with a 12–2 record. This placement qualified the team for playoffs, where they defeated MAD Team 3–0 in the second round but lost to Flash Wolves 0–3 in the finals.

G-Rex participated in the 2018 Rift Rivals tournament as a representative of the LMS, against teams from China's League of Legends Pro League (LPL) and South Korea's League of Legends Champions Korea (LCK).

In preparation for the 2018 LMS Summer Split, G-Rex replaced inactive jungler Laba with Oh "Raise" Ji-hwan. The team ended the regular season in fifth place, with a 6–8 record. This placement qualified G-Rex for the 2018 LMS Regional Finals, where they defeated Hong Kong Attitude 3–1 in the semifinals and J Team 3–0 in the finals, qualifying them as the LMS's third seed for the 2018 World Championship, their first international tournament.

G-Rex was placed in Group D of the 2018 World Championship play-in stage, along with Russian team Gambit Esports and Chilean team Kaos Latin Gamers. The team placed first in their group with a 4–0 record, and later qualified for the main event after defeating Turkish team SuperMassive eSports 3–1 in the play-in knockout stage. For the main event, G-Rex was placed in Group D, along with Chinese team Invictus Gaming, European team Fnatic, and North American team 100 Thieves. After failing to win a single game, G-Rex ended last in Group D with a 0–6 record.

Following their disappointing performance at the World Championship, G-Rex confirmed the departures of Raise and Stitch on 20 November 2018; two days later, Candy's departure was confirmed. On 27 December 2018, G-Rex revised their starting roster in preparation for the 2019 LMS Spring Split; Empt2y moved to a coaching position, baybay moved to G-Rex Infinite, Koala departed, and Raise rejoined. Jungler Wu "Epic" Chun-hin, support Yin "Eason" Yi-shen, and bot laners Sung "Atlen" Ya-lun and Chiu "Bruce" Chih-chun also joined the team on the same day to complete the roster.

After a weak start to the 2019 LMS Spring Split, Empt2y and Candy rejoined the roster in the latter half of the season, but failed to improve the team enough to make playoffs. G-Rex ended the regular season in sixth place, with a 6–8 record. In the following offseason, junglers Epic and Raise left the team and were replaced by LMS veterans Huang "Gemini" Chu-hsuan and Xue "Mountain" Zhao-hong, while Empt2y resumed his duties as assistant coach.

Despite plans to compete in the LMS's successor league, the Pacific Championship Series, G-Rex announced its disbandment on 13 February 2020.
