= Hong Kong Attitude =

Hong Kong esports organisation

- Short name: HKA
- Game: Arena of Valor
- Founded: 22 March 2013
- League: Pacific Championship Series
- Based in: Hong Kong
- Owner: Derek Cheung
- Parent group: Hong Kong Esports
- Website: hkesports.com

Chinese name
- Traditional Chinese: 香港態度
- Simplified Chinese: 香港态度
Transcriptions
Standard Mandarin
- Hanyu Pinyin: Xiānggǎng Tàidù
Yue: Cantonese
- Yale Romanization: Hēunggóng Taaidouh
- Jyutping: Hoeng^{1}gong^{2} Taai^{3}dou^{6}

Hong Kong Attitude (HKA) is a professional esports organisation based in Hong Kong. Its parent company is Hong Kong Esports, and all of its teams were previously known by that name from October 2014 to 16 May 2017.

Hong Kong Attitude previously had a League of Legends team which competed in the Pacific Championship Series, the top level of professional competition for the game in Taiwan, Hong Kong, Macau, and Southeast Asia. The team qualified for the League of Legends World Championship in 2017 and 2019 after winning those years' LMS regional finals.

== League of Legends ==
=== History ===
==== 2013–2014 ====
Hong Kong Attitude (HKA) was founded on 22 March 2013 with a tentative roster consisting of top laner Kan "MyticQ" Ho-man (now known as Kabe), jungler Cheng "Fai" Hiu-fai, and bot laner Lee "Owl" Yiu-shin. They were later joined by mid laner Lo "PaSa" Hung-sing and top laner Siu "ReD" Hin-lee in April. On 30 June 2013, HKA finished first in the Cyber Games Arena 2013 Hong Kong Tournament, with the organisation's manager Derek Cheung as a temporary substitute.

Bot laner Fok "Nogod" Ching-chun and support Lee "Wind" Chi-wa joined the team in August 2013. On 4 September 2013, HKA Mage and HKA Priest were created as sister teams to compete in the League of Legends Nova League (LNL), the highest level of competitive play in Taiwan, Hong Kong, and Macau at the time. In late October 2013, HKA acquired bot laner Yeung "Yau" Chin-yau and support Tam "Perhapstky" Kwun-yeung, while Owl left the team and Wind became inactive. HKA participated in its first major international tournament when it attended IEM Season VIII – Singapore, which was held from 28 November to 1 December 2013.

For much of the latter half of 2013 and early half of 2014, HKA maintained a consistent roster with MyticQ, Fai, and PaSa, while the bottom lane saw a few roster changes and experimentations with players' roles being swapped. However, in May 2014, nearly all of HKA's players were replaced by the roster of YouCantStopMe, another LNL team, which stayed with the organisation until August. In late October 2014 the team rebranded under the name of its parent organisation, Hong Kong Esports.

==== 2017–present ====
All of Hong Kong Esports' sponsored teams had their names changed back to Hong Kong Attitude on 16 May 2017. For the 2017 LMS Summer Split, HKA fielded a main roster consisting of top laner Baek "Riris" Seung-min, junglers Cheung "GodKwai" Ho-wan and Huang "Gemini" Chu-xuan, mid laner Chen "M1ssion" Hsiao-hsien, bot laner Wong "Unified" Chun-kit, and support Ling "Kaiwing" Kai-wing. The team placed sixth in the regular season with a 7–7 record, qualifying them for that year's LMS Regional Finals, which determines the third seed from the LMS at the 2017 World Championship, but not for playoffs. In the LMS Regional Finals, HKA took convincing wins over J Team and Raise Gaming, beating them 3–1 and 3–0 respectively and qualifying for the play-in stage of the 2017 World Championship.

HKA was placed in Group D of the 2017 World Championship play-in stage, along with Turkish team 1907 Fenerbahçe and Japanese team Rampage (Pentagram). The team placed second in their group with a 3–1 record after losing a tiebreaker match to Fenerbahçe. HKA was unable to qualify for the main event after losing 0–3 to Fnatic in the play-in knockout stage.

GodKwai and M1ssion left HKA in the offseason before the 2018 LMS Spring Split, and were replaced by jungler Kim "Nova" Dong-hyeon and mid laners Wong "Chawy" Xing Lei and Lam "Gear" Kwok-wa. Support Lee "Destiny" Jae-hoon also joined the team, but was released from his contract four weeks into the regular season because he refused to role-swap to jungle following disappointing results. HKA placed seventh with a 3–11 record, failing to qualify for playoffs but avoiding the relegation tournament.

In preparation for the 2018 LMS Summer Split, HKA acquired top laner Jeon "erssu" Ik-soo and mid laner Yu "cyeol" Chung-yeol, and released Riris, Nova, and Gear from their contracts. HKA placed fourth in the regular season with a 8–6 record, qualifying them for playoffs, where they placed fourth after losing to J Team 1–3 in the first round. Their overall placement in the summer split guaranteed them a spot in the 2018 LMS Regional Finals and a chance to qualify for the 2018 World Championship. However, HKA failed to qualify for the World Championship after losing to G-Rex 1–3 in the first round.

Following the 2018 LMS Regional Finals, erssu and cyeol departed from the team, and Chawy moved to a coaching role. On 27 December 2018, HKA acquired top laner Chen "3z" Han and mid laner Sit "Error" Chong Fai from Machi Esports and Kowloon Esports respectively. M1sson also rejoined HKA on the same day, while bot laner Wong "MnM" Ka-chun was promoted to the main roster from a trainee position.

HKA placed fifth in the 2019 LMS Spring regular season with a 7–7 record, failing to qualify for playoffs. In the 2019 LMS Summer regular season HKA placed third with a 6–6 record, qualifying for playoffs, where they lost 2–3 to ahq eSports Club in the second round. HKA's overall placement once again qualified them for the regional finals, where they swept both Flash Wolves and G-Rex to qualify for the 2019 World Championship.

At the 2019 World Championship, HKA was placed in Group C of the first round of the play-in stage, along with Vietnamese team Lowkey Esports and Thai team MEGA. HKA secured first in their group with a 3–1 record, qualifying for the second round, where they defeated Latin American team Isurus Gaming 3–1 to qualify for the main event.

Riot Games announced on 19 December 2019 that HKA would be one of ten teams participating in the newly created Pacific Championship Series. HKA placed eighth in the 2020 PCS Spring regular season after winning a tiebreaker match against Liyab Esports and losing one afterwards to J Team. This placement earned the team a spot in the first round of playoffs in the losers' bracket. HKA's playoff run ended in the third round after they were swept by ahq eSports Club, and the team finished fourth overall.

=== Name censorship controversy ===
During the 2019 World Championship, members of Riot Games' official broadcasting team seemingly avoided using the team's full name and instead opted to use the abbreviation HKA. M1ssion's post-match interview after his team's victory over Isurus Gaming was also delayed in the English broadcast. This caused speculation amongst the League of Legends community outside of China as it was done amidst pro-democracy protests in Hong Kong, leading some fans to believe that Riot was censoring the word "Hong Kong" due to the company's ownership by Chinese conglomerate Tencent. Riot's communications lead Ryan Rigney later addressed the controversy, saying: "We refer to their team interchangeably by both their full name and their tricode abbreviation HKA, as we routinely do with all of the teams in our ecosystem. To make this as explicit as possible, we aren't telling anyone to avoid saying 'Hong Kong'. We'd just rather the team be referred to by its full name. There's been some confusion internally about this as well and we're working to correct it."

== Arena of Valor ==
=== Current roster ===
Hong Kong Attitude Arena of Valor roster
Players
Coaches

Role	Handle	Name	Nationality
Top	Fong	Shi-feng	Taiwan
Jungle	DaDa	Guo Da-ming	Taiwan
Mid	ikk	Xie Dong-ye	Taiwan
Mid	Weinnn	Wu Wei-en	Taiwan
Support	Junnn	Chen Guan-jun	Taiwan

Head coach

Lin "Ting" Chun-ting

Legend:
- (I) Inactive
- (S) Suspended
- Substitute
- (injured) Injury / Illness

Roster updated 18 December 2022.

== Overwatch ==
=== History ===
Hong Kong Attitude disbanded its Overwatch team on 25 January 2019.
