= League of Legends Master Series =

Esports league in Taiwan (2015–2019)

- Formerly: League of Legends Nova League (LNL)
- Sport: League of Legends
- Founded: 2014
- First season: Spring 2015
- Folded: 25 November 2019
- Replaced by: Pacific Championship Series (merged with LST)
- Owner: Garena
- No. of teams: 8
- Countries: Taiwan/Hong Kong/Macau
- Headquarters: Neihu, Taipei
- Venue: Garena e-Sports Stadium
- Last champion: J Team (1st title)
- Most titles: Flash Wolves (7 titles)
- Broadcasters: Garena Live, Twitch, YouTube
- Sponsors: Garena, Riot Games
- Relegation to: Elite Challenger Series (ECS)
- Related competitions: Garena Premier League
- Website: lms.garena.tw

League of Legends Master Series
- Traditional Chinese: 台港澳職業聯賽
- Simplified Chinese: 台港澳职业联赛
- Literal meaning: TW/HK/MO Professional League
Transcriptions
Standard Mandarin
- Hanyu Pinyin: Tái Gǎng Ào Zhíyè Liánsài
Yue: Cantonese
- Jyutping: Toi^{4} Gong^{2} Ou^{3} Zik^{1}jip^{6} Lyun^{4}coi^{3}

The League of Legends Master Series (LMS) was a professional League of Legends league with teams from Taiwan, Hong Kong, and Macau from 2015 to 2019. Eight teams competed over two seasons to qualify for the League of Legends World Championship. In September 2019, Riot announced that the LMS would merge with the League of Legends SEA Tour (LST) to create a new professional league for all Garena-affiliated regions except Vietnam, the Pacific Championship Series (PCS).

== History ==
An announcement was made by Garena in October 2014 about plans of creating a new league to separate Taiwan, Hong Kong, and Macau from the rest of the Garena Premier League (GPL) of Southeast Asia. The league would have two seasons per year, spring and summer. The regional quota of two slots in the GPL and a single seed in the World Championship every year temporarily offset the dominance of the Taiwanese teams, but these conditions were not enough as the slots of the Southeast Asia in the World Championship 2014 were both filled by Taiwanese teams. As part of the changes to the 2015 GPL, the region consisting of Taiwan, Hong Kong, and Macau left the GPL and began to compete instead in the LMS, which replaced the Nova League in Taiwan. This action was done to allow Southeast Asian teams a better chance at winning the GPL, as Taiwanese teams had won every GPL season.

In April 2019, Garena removed Dragon Gate Team from the league following a match-fixing investigation. The team's owner was banned from affiliation with any Riot-sanctioned team, and its jungler, coach and manager were suspended.

In September 2019, it was announced that the LMS would be merged with the League of Legends SEA Tour (LST) to create a new professional league for all Garena-affiliated regions (excluded Vietnam), the Pacific Championship Series (PCS).

== Logistics ==
Each LMS team was supported by Garena with NT$200,000, which did not include prize money. Teams from Hong Kong and Macau were provided with flights and accommodations, and received an additional NT$60,000. The beginning of the LMS coincided with the construction of the Garena e-Sports Stadium, located on the first floor of an office building in Neihu, Taipei.

== Format ==
=== Group stage ===
- Offline tournament
- Double round robin, matches are best-of-three
- Top four teams receives a spot in playoffs
- Bottom team will play in the promotion tournament for a spot in the next season

=== Playoffs ===
- Offline tournament
- Single elimination tournament, seeding is based on regular season ranks
- All matches are best-of-five
- Total prize pool is NT$5,800,000 (≈$182,740 USD)

== Past seasons ==
Year	Split	1st	2nd	3rd	4th	Qualified for Worlds		
Year	Split	1st	2nd	3rd	4th	Seed 1	Seed 2	Seed 3
2015	Spring	ahq eSports Club	Flash Wolves	Taipei Assassins	Hong Kong Esports	ahq eSports Club	Flash Wolves	N/A
2015	Summer	ahq eSports Club	Hong Kong Esports	Flash Wolves	Midnight Sun Esports	ahq eSports Club	Flash Wolves	N/A
2016	Spring	Flash Wolves	ahq eSports Club	Machi 17	Taipei Assassins	Flash Wolves	ahq eSports Club	N/A
2016	Summer	Flash Wolves	J Team	ahq eSports Club	Hong Kong Esports	Flash Wolves	ahq eSports Club	N/A
2017	Spring	Flash Wolves	ahq eSports Club	J Team	Machi 17	Flash Wolves	ahq eSports Club	Hong Kong Attitude
2017	Summer	Flash Wolves	ahq eSports Club	Raise Gaming	J Team	Flash Wolves	ahq eSports Club	Hong Kong Attitude
2018	Spring	Flash Wolves	G-Rex	MAD Team	Machi 17	Flash Wolves	MAD Team	G-Rex
2018	Summer	Flash Wolves	MAD Team	J Team	Hong Kong Attitude	Flash Wolves	MAD Team	G-Rex
2019	Spring	Flash Wolves	MAD Team	ahq eSports Club	J Team	J Team	ahq eSports Club	Hong Kong Attitude
2019	Summer	J Team	ahq eSports Club	Hong Kong Attitude	MAD Team	J Team	ahq eSports Club	Hong Kong Attitude
