= Flash Wolves =

Taiwanese esports organization

- Short name: FW
- Games: Arena of Valor; Hearthstone; League of Legends: Wild Rift
- Founded: 10 December 2010
- Team history: Xpec Ironmen (2010–2012) yoe Ironmen (2012–2013) yoe Flash Wolves (2013–2015); Flash Wolves (2015–present)
- Based in: Taichung, Taiwan
- Website: www.flashwolves.com

The Flash Wolves (Chinese: 閃電狼; pinyin: Shǎndiàn Láng) are a Taiwanese esports organization with players competing in Arena of Valor, Hearthstone, and League of Legends: Wild Rift. They formerly had teams competing in League of Legends, Overwatch, Special Force II, StarCraft II, and World of Tanks.

The Flash Wolves' League of Legends team was created after the draft in the Taiwan eSports League Draft Season. It competed in the League of Legends Masters Series (LMS)—the top league in Taiwan, Hong Kong and Macau—and was one of the best teams in the region. The team reached the quarterfinals of the World Championship for the first time in 2015.

== League of Legends ==
Flash Wolves
- Game: League of Legends
- Founded: 15 April 2013
- League: LMS
- Based in: Taipei
- Arena: Garena E-Sports Stadium
- Colors: Blue and yellow
- Championships: 7× LMS

=== History ===
==== 2013 ====
The Flash Wolves were originally established under the name yoe IRONMEN on 15 April 2013, after the draft season of the Taiwan e-Sports League (TeSL). After finishing 6th in the TeSL, the team struggled in the Season 3 Taiwan Regional Finals group stage and received the last slot in group B, prompting four of the five players on the team to leave. As a result, the team announced it would forfeit all its remaining matches and began reforming itself. On 22 August, the team rebranded as yoe Flash Wolves and signed nearly the entire roster of Gamania Bears on 21 October, automatically qualifying them for the 2014 LNL Winter and the 2014 GPL Winter splits. However, they gave up their spot in the latter due to Riot Games' player age limit rules.

The Flash Wolves made an impressive return in the 2013 WCG Taiwan Qualifiers, defeating two established Taiwanese powerhouses, the Taipei Assassins and ahq e-Sports Club, and earning a spot in the 2013 World Cyber Games.

==== 2014 ====
In 2014, the Flash Wolves saw several roster changes: Dee left the team on 13 January; on 24 January, Mountain joined as the team's new starting jungler, REFRA1N moved to the mid lane, Maple became a substitute player, and HueiYun left; Maooo and Maple were moved to the academy team yoe Flash Wolves Junior on 21 February; and Mountain left on 30 April. The Flash Wolves finished 4th in the LNL Winter split.

==== 2015 ====
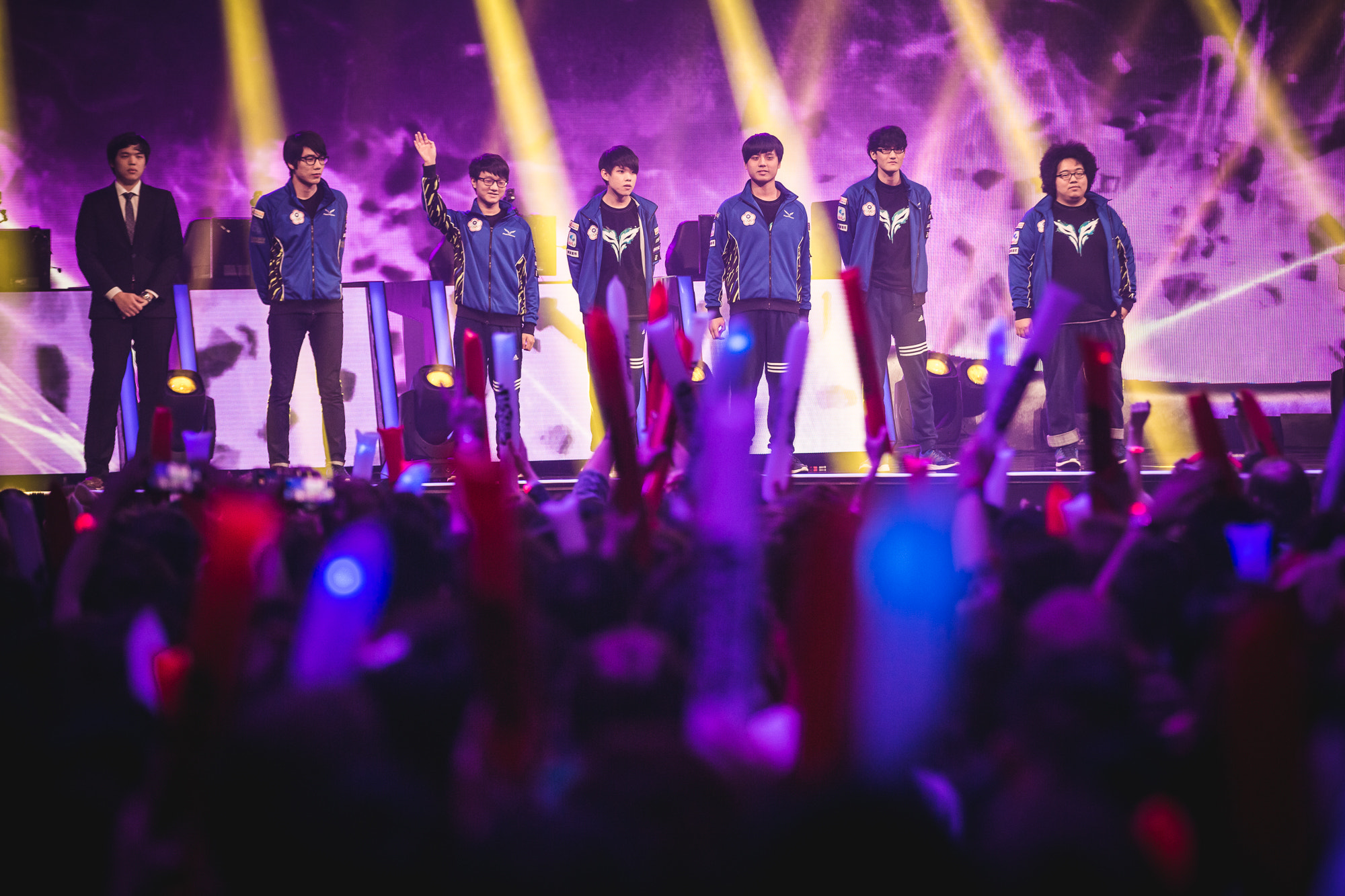
Flash Wolves on stage at the 2015 League of Legends World Championship quarter-finals.

The Flash Wolves finished first at IEM Season IX – Taipei on 30 January by beating the Taipei Assassins 2–1. In March, the Flash Wolves defeated SK Gaming in the second round of the group state at IEM Season IX Katowice, qualifying for the semifinals, where they were defeated by Team SoloMid 2–1.

The Flash Wolves finished 2nd in both the 2015 LMS Spring playoffs and the 2015 LMS Summer regular season, and 3rd in the 2015 LMS Summer playoffs.

In May, the Flash Wolves announced the formation of a female League of Legends team.

The Flash Wolves were the 2nd seed representing the Taiwan/Hong Kong/Macau region in the 2015 League of Legends World Championship. On 11 October, Kaohsiung Mayor Chen Chu made a surprise visit to Paris to meet with the Flash Wolves and ahq e-Sports Club, wishing them luck in the World Championship. The team won their preliminary group, but finished in 5th–8th overall after losing to Origen 1–3.

==== 2016 ====
The Flash Wolves finished 2nd in the 2016 LMS Spring Split regular season with 9 wins, 2 draws and 3 losses. Heading into the playoffs, the team was able to defeat both Machi and ahq in 3–0 sweeps, winning their first LMS title. This qualified them for the 2016 Mid-Season Invitational, where they managed to take games off SK Telecom T1, G2 Esports and SuperMassive eSports, advancing to the semifinals. However, the Flash Wolves ultimately lost their series 1–3 to Counter Logic Gaming, placing 3rd–4th.

The Flash Wolves finished 2nd in the 2016 LMS Summer Split regular season, but were able to win their 2nd LMS title after defeating ahq in a close five-game series and J Team in a convincing 3–0 sweep. Qualifying for the 2016 World Championship as the #1 seed from the LMS, the Flash Wolves were drawn into Group B against South Korea's SK Telecom T1, China's IMay and North America's Cloud9. They finished last in their group with a record of 2 wins to 4 losses.

==== 2019 ====
The team had competed in the LMS since 2015. The Flash Wolves announced on 13 December 2019 that it was disbanding its League of Legends team and would not participate in the upcoming Pacific Championship Series (PCS), the successor to the LMS.

=== Tournament results ===
==== Premier tournaments ====
- 5th–8th — 2013 World Cyber Games

==== 2014 ====
- 5th–8th — 2014 GPL Spring
- 4th — 2014 LNL Winter

==== 2015 ====
- 1st — 2015 LMS Regional Qualifiers
- 3rd — 2015 LMS Summer Playoffs
- 2nd — 2015 LMS Spring Playoffs
- 1st — 2015 LMS Spring Round Robin
- 3rd–4th — IEM Season IX World Championship Katowice
- 1st — IEM Season IX – Taipei
- 5th–8th — 2015 League of Legends World Championship

==== 2017 ====
- 1st — IEM Season XI – Katowice

== Arena of Valor ==
=== Roster ===
Nat.	ID	Name	Role	Date of birth	Joined
(Taiwan)	Kato	Chun Tseng-yung (曾勇峻)	Jungle	28 June 1997	1 January 2020
(Taiwan)	Gua	Chen En-hao (陳恩豪)	Support	6 May 2002	25 July 2018
(Taiwan)	GaDuo	Su Yu-yan (蘇育彥)	Side Lane	8 June 1996	1 January 2020

=== Tournament results ===
==== 2020 ====
- 1st — Arena of Valor Premier League 2020
- 2nd — GCS Summer 2020

== Special Force II ==
The Taichung Flash Wolves were one of the top Special Force II teams in Taiwan and began competing in the inaugural Special Force II Pro League that began in October 2015.

== StarCraft II ==
The Flash Wolves' former StarCraft II roster consisted of PartinG, Leenock, San, Has and Ian.

Awards and achievements
Preceded by ahq e-Sports Club	League of Legends Master Series winner 2016 Spring – 2019 Spring	Succeeded by J Team
Preceded by SK Telecom T1	Intel Extreme Masters World Championship winner Season XI (2017); With: MMD, Karsa, Maple, Betty, SwordArt, and Steak (coach)	Succeeded by tournament discontinued
