= League of Legends: Wild Rift =

Multiplayer online battle arena video game

- Developer: Riot Games
- Publisher: Riot Games
- Director: Andrei "Meddler" van Roon
- Composer: Brendon Williams
- Series: League of Legends
- Engine: Unity
- Platforms: Android; iOS; iPadOS
- Release: October 27, 2020
- Genre: Multiplayer online battle arena
- Mode: Multiplayer

League of Legends: Wild Rift (abbreviated League: WR or simply Wild Rift) is a free-to-play multiplayer online battle arena mobile game developed and published by Riot Games. It was released on October 27, 2020 for Android and iOS as a modified version of the PC game League of Legends.

As in League of Legends, players control a character ("champion") with unique abilities and battle against a team of players or AI-controlled units, with the goal of destroying the opposing team's "Nexus". Each League of Legends: Wild Rift match is discrete, with all champions starting off relatively weak but increasing in strength by accumulating items and experience over the course of the game. Character design is influenced by a variety of genres, including high fantasy, steampunk, and Lovecraftian horror.

== Gameplay ==
Wild Rift's gameplay showing the touch controls and minimap

League of Legends: Wild Rift is a multiplayer online battle arena (MOBA) game in the three-dimensional isometric perspective. With gameplay similar to the League of Legends PC version, the objective of the game is to take down the opposing team's base. To be compatible with mobile devices, Wild Rift received some adaptations, making the game's performance rate faster compared to the PC version. Its map has been reduced in size, the respawn time is shorter, the gold gain is greatly accelerated and the regeneration time has been cut in half. Due to this, while on the PC version a match can last regularly 45 minutes, on the mobile version matches last approximately fifteen to twenty minutes. There are currently two different modes: Wild Rift (which covers PVP, ranked, and tournament draft) and ARAM.

=== Wild Rift ===
Each match is played by ten players who are distributed in two teams for a 5v5 confrontation. The players must each select a character, which are called champions by the game. To win the match, teams work together to destroy a structure called the Nexus in the enemy team's base, bypassing a line of defensive structures called turrets. Unlike the PC version of League, Nexus turrets were removed, and the Nexus itself is able to attack target units. The mode has a ranked competitive ladder with a matchmaking system determining the player's skill level. There are currently 11 tiers; from least to most skilled, Iron, Bronze, Silver, Gold, Platinum, Emerald, Diamond, Master, Grandmaster, Challenger, and Sovereign.

=== ARAM mode ===
In addition to the normal field, present in ranked and PVP mode, there is the ARAM (All Random, All Mid) mode. In this second mode, the number of players is the same as in the normal, 5v5 mode, however, the champions are chosen randomly. Also, the battlefield is reduced, as there is no jungle area nor top and lower route and only mid. Consequently, there is no dragon or baron quest in this mode.

== Development ==
=== Pre-release ===
After fully acquiring Riot Games in 2015, Tencent asked them to turn League of Legends into a mobile title. However, Riot declined and claimed that the game could not be replicated on smartphones. Tencent then created their own mobile MOBA, Honor of Kings (with its international adaptation known as Arena of Valor). The aforementioned games was then reportedly straining their business relationship, and the relationship between the two firms became further strained when Tencent used notable League of Legends players to promote Arena of Valor and its esports tournaments.

Riot Games's complaints initiated a two-month marketing freeze for Arena of Valor and demands that Riot Games would be given the option to review all marketing plans, including a veto for use of select celebrity gamers. Nonetheless, Riot Games implied that their relationship with Tencent is still strong, and the conflict between them and their games is only "a bump in the road".

Riot Games eventually acknowledged the potential of the mobile market for the MOBA genre, and agreed to develop a mobile title for League of Legends. Tencent then temporarily pulled marketing plans for Arena of Valor in Europe and North America in 2019, clearing room for Riot Games's announcement of League of Legends: Wild Rift a few months later.

League of Legends: Wild Rift was announced on October 15, 2019, on the 10th anniversary of League of Legends.

=== Release ===
League of Legends: Wild Rift was set to be released on October 27, 2020, with a limited alpha launch in Brazil and Philippines in June 2020. Along with the release, a cinematic trailer was posted by the official League of Legends: Wild Rift channel on YouTube.

On September 16, 2020, Wild Rift was released in closed beta in Southeast Asia via Google Play and Apple's TestFlight, with more regions to be added at a later date. On October 8, 2020, the closed beta returned, adding South Korea and Japan.

The regional open beta for Southeast Asia began on October 27, 2020. On December 7, 2020, the beta was expanded to include Vietnam, Oceania, and Taiwan. On December 10, 2020, the open beta was expanded ahead of schedule to include the Commonwealth of Independent States, Europe, Middle East, and Turkey.

The open beta launched in the Americas on March 29, 2021.

For China, Wild Rift has received game approval from China's National Press and Publication Administration in early 2021. On October 8, 2021, the game went out of open beta and was officially released by Tencent.

Riot Games intends to release Wild Rift on consoles. Executive producer Alan Moore reported that the version was in development, but no updates on the work were provided in 2022.

=== Revenue model ===
League of Legends: Wild Rift uses a free-to-play business model. "Skins", used as purely cosmetic customization of champions can be acquired after buying and using an in-game currency called Wild Cores. New skins are debuting in Wild Rift, such as the "Stargazer" skin line, and other standalone skins. A new feature currently exclusive to Wild Rift is "champion poses", changing the pose of the selected champion just before the game begins and right after the game ends. These are unlocked through chests in events. Similar to "battle passes", a system called Wild Passes have been introduced as a way to get skins, currency, player icons, emotes, and other cosmetic upgrades. Upon purchasing a pass, players will be given an exclusive skin (the "Hexplorer" skin line), and reaching the maximum level will grant a pose for that exclusive skin. Passes can be leveled up through in-game missions, or buying levels for certain amounts of Wild Cores.

== Reception ==
Reception

Aggregate score
Aggregator	Score
Metacritic	89/100

Review scores
Publication	Score
Jeuxvideo.com	18/20
PCMag	4/5

League of Legends: Wild Rift was well received by video game critics. On the review aggregator website Metacritic, the game received a score of 89 out of 100 based on 7 reviews. Cass Marshall, from Polygon, said Wild Rift provides "a great alternative for those intimidated by the PC version of League". Jordan Minor from PCMag gave Wild Rift 4 out of 5 stars and called it "a surprisingly capable mobile edition" of League of Legends. The editor praised the art style of the game and also its capacity to function on weak hardware devices. The Washington Post's Shannon Liao said the game was "a much more beginner-friendly" than League of Legends, but felt that its tutorial could be more comprehensive. Andrew Webster with The Verge wrote that despite the complexity of League of Legends's gameplay, Wild Rift, in contrast, "does an excellent job of easing in new players by explaining the basics in simple terms".

Regarding game control, while the touchscreen controls used for attacks were praised as "perfectly playable" and "intuitive", the virtual joystick utilized for movement was described as "serviceable, but like all virtual joysticks, it can be unresponsive at times". Still about it, Minor wrote that command "don't always keep up with the action".

During the 25th Annual D.I.C.E. Awards, the Academy of Interactive Arts & Sciences nominated League of Legends: Wild Rift for Mobile Game of the Year. It won the "Innovation" award at the Apple Design Awards in 2021.

=== Player behavior ===
Wild Rift's player base in the United States has reportedly been "way less toxic" than League of Legends', which Liao and PC Gamer's Steven Messner attributed to the amount of effort required to type on a smartphone. Liao observed that despite some occurrences of bickering she encountered "over taking a role someone else wanted", the game "seems to be injecting new life into a community that has grown pretty insular".

== See also ==
- League of Legends
- MOBA
- Mobile gaming
- Riot Games
- Esports
