= J Team =

Taiwanese esports organization

- Short name: JT
- Founded: 19 April 2016
- Based in: Taipei, Taiwan
- Owner: Jay Chou
- Main sponsor: CTBC Bank
- Parent group: JY Entertainment
- Website: www.jy-ents.com

Chinese name
- Traditional Chinese: （台北）J戰隊
- Literal meaning: (Taipei) J Team
Transcriptions
Standard Mandarin
- Hanyu Pinyin: (Táiběi) J Zhànduì

J Team is a Taiwanese esports organization owned by JY Entertainment. It was founded in April 2016 by Jay Chou after he purchased the League of Legends Master Series spot of Taipei Assassins, which had won the Season 2 World Championship in 2012.

J Team's League of Legends team competed in the League of Legends Master Series and later the Pacific Championship Series. J Team disbanded its League of Legends division in 2024 after failing to secure a spot in the League of Legends Championship Pacific.

== League of Legends ==
Taiwanese singer Jay Chou announced on 19 April 2016 that he had acquired the LMS spot of Taipei Assassins for his new esports organization, J Team. J Team debuted in the 2016 LMS Summer Split with an inaugural roster consisting of top laners Chen "Morning" Kuan-ting and Chen "RLun" Cheng-lun, jungler Chen "REFRA1N" Kuan-ting, mid laner Chu "FoFo" Chun-lan, bot laner Chang "BeBe" Bo-wei, and support Li "Jay" Chieh. The team placed first in the regular season with a 10–4–0 record but lost 0–3 to the Flash Wolves in the finals. J Team's second-place finish in playoffs qualified them for the 2016 LMS Regional Qualifiers and a chance at participating in the 2016 World Championship; however, they were defeated 2–3 in the semifinals by Machi Esports. J Team placed fifth/sixth at IEM Season 11 Gyeonggi after losing to North America's Immortals, with Chen "Achie" Chen-chi replacing REFRA1N in the jungle.

In the 2017 LMS Spring Split J Team placed third in both the regular season and playoffs, losing in the second round of the latter to ahq eSports Club. J Team was one of four teams that represented the LMS at Rift Rivals 2017, where the league placed last. J Team placed fourth in both the regular season and playoffs of the 2017 LMS Summer Split after losing to ahq once again in the playoffs. Top laner Morning was replaced by Hsu "Rest" Shih-chieh during the playoffs. J Team was unable to qualify for the 2017 World Championship after losing to Hong Kong Attitude in the regional finals.

J Team placed fifth in the 2018 LMS Spring regular season and fourth in the 2018 LMS Summer regular season, both times with 6–8 records. After losing 0–3 to MAD Team in the 2018 LMS Summer playoffs, J Team finished 3rd and prepared for the upcoming regional finals. J Team was once again unsuccessful in qualifying for the World Championship after being swept 0–3 by G-Rex.

J Team placed third in the 2019 LMS Spring regular season and fourth in playoffs after losing 1–3 to ahq. In the 2019 LMS Summer Split, J Team finished first in both the regular season and playoffs, defeating ahq 3–1 in the finals and securing their first LMS title under the J Team name. This also qualified J Team for the 2019 World Championship as the LMS' first seed where they ultimately ranked 9th.
