= Machi Esports =

Taiwanese esports organization

- Short name: Machi, MCX
- Founded: 13 January 2014
- Folded: 27 December 2022
- Based in: Taipei, Taiwan
- Parent group: Machi

Machi Esports was a professional esports organization founded by Taiwanese hip hop group Machi. Machi previously had a League of Legends team competing in the League of Legends Master Series (LMS) and later the Pacific Championship Series (PCS), as well as an academy team competing in the Elite Challenger Series (ECS) named MachiX.

== History ==
Machi sold its spot in the LMS to Alpha Esports in late 2018.

It was announced on 18 February 2020 that Machi would be one of the ten franchise partners of the PCS, the successor to the LMS, after G-Rex forfeited its spot and disbanded.
