= Ahq eSports Club =

Taiwanese esports organization

ahq eSports Club
- Nickname: "Red Pegasus" (赤色天馬)
- Short name: ahq / AHQ
- Divisions: League of Legends; PlayerUnknown's Battlegrounds
- Founded: September 2012
- Folded: 2021
- Based in: Zhonghe District, New Taipei City, Taiwan
- Championships: 2× LMS, 1× GPL
- Website: www.ahq.com.tw

Chinese name
- Traditional Chinese: ahq電子競技俱樂部
- Simplified Chinese: ahq电子竞技俱乐部
Transcriptions
Standard Mandarin
- Hanyu Pinyin: ahq Diànzǐ Jìngjì Jùlèbù

ahq eSports Club was a Taiwanese esports organization based in New Taipei City. It was best known for its League of Legends team, which competed in the League of Legends Masters Series and later the Pacific Championship Series. After winning the 2015 LMS Summer Playoffs, AHQ qualified for the 2015 World Championship, where they placed fifth to eighth after losing to SKT T1 in the quarterfinals.

== League of Legends ==
=== History ===
==== Formation ====
In September 2012, after Corsair failed to travel to the Season 2 World Championship, AHQ was forced to merge with them and SSWIE before changing its name to "ahq eSports Club." UDJ, ArTie, Prydz, and Mralbis from Corsair, along with GreenTea from SSWIE, composed the first lineup of AHQ.

==== 2013 ====
In 2013, team captain UDJ retired, and GarnetDevil joined. AHQ was invited to join the Garena Premier League (GPL)'s 2013 spring season to face teams such as the Taipei Assassins and the Singapore Sentinels. In March, Westdoor and Lantyr both joined AHQ and became the team's main players. They finished the GPL spring season 2013 in third place.

In GPL Summer 2013, the team improved from the previous year, beating the Taipei Assassins and the Singapore Sentinels and winning the season with a 24–4 record. They made it to the GPL Finals to face the winner of the Spring Season, the Taipei Assassins. At the same time, AHQ also joined TeSL and met the other strong team in Taiwan, the Taipei Snipers. AHQ finished TeSL in second place.

The team beat TPA in the 2013 GPL Finals. At the Season 3 World Championship, they were beaten by the TeSL team Gamania Bears.

==== 2014 ====
After Season 3, AHQ acquired Naz from Wayi Spider while Lantyr moved to AHQ Fighter. AHQ won 20 matches and only lost one game in the 2014 LNL Winter. However, in the 2014 GPL Winter, they lost to the Taipei Snipers and placed third.

AHQ had a successful run in the 2014 GPL Spring group stages, where they achieved a record of 9–1. In the playoffs, they dominated the Singapore Sentinels 3–0 in the quarterfinals before dispatching the Saigon Jokers 3–1 in the semifinals. In the finals, however, they lost to the Taipei Assassins 2-3 and ended the playoffs in second place.

2014 GPL Summer, starting in June 2014, featured another successful run in the group stages by AHQ, when they achieved an 8–2 record. In the playoffs, they won 3–0 against the Bangkok Titans in the quarterfinals and won 3–1 against Logitech G Fighter in the semifinals, mirroring their performance earlier in the year. (Full Louis got disqualified from GPL this season due to using players who were not 17 years of age, SofM, and Jeff. Logitech G Fighter replaced them by playing in the semifinals. Unfortunately, they went on to lose to the Taipei Assassins 0–3 in the finals, achieving another second-place record in the playoffs.

While they were unable to become the champions of the 2014 GPL Summer, their dominating performance in the 2014 Garena Regional Finals (where they emerged as the number-one seed in the Taiwan and SEA region by beating the Saigon Fantastic Five in the finals) allowed them to participate in the 2014 Season World Championship.

Seeded into Group A of the 2014 Season World Championship in Taiwan, the team played against EDward Gaming, Samsung White , and Dark Passage. AHQ's 3–3 record qualified them for a tiebreaker into the bracket, where they lost to EDward Gaming.

==== 2015 ====
After a disappointing run in the 2014 Season World Championship, AHQ acquired Mountain and OhReaL from Logitech Snipers, Ziv from HK Attitude Mage, and MrAlbis from Logitech G Fighter. Naz and GarnetDevil left, while Prydz became the analyst.

The new roster qualified for IEM Season IX - Taipei in IEM Season IX, where they won 2–0 against the Logitech Snipers, 2–0 against Hong Kong Esports, and 2–1 against the Yoe Flash Wolves in the winner's bracket finals. At IEM Season IX - Taipei, AHQ would receive a quarterfinal bye for winning the winner's bracket finals, but would then be defeated 0–2 against the Yoe Flash Wolves.

Season 5 marked the start of the League of Legends Masters Series, a new league exclusive to teams from Taiwan, Hong Kong, and Macao. AHQ was invited to its qualifiers, where they went 3–0 in their group to earn a berth in the regular season. They finished fourth in the round robin, with a 13–8 record, but went on to win the playoffs with 3-0 victories over Hong Kong Esports and the Taipei Assassins, followed by a 3-1 finals victory over the Flash Wolves.

Because of their spring split-victory, AHQ were invited to play at the 2015 Mid-Season Invitational. Finishing 3–2 in the group stage, AHQ advanced to the bracket, but were knocked out immediately by eventual tournament winners EDG.

AHQ went on to sweep their way through the Summer Season, with a win-tie-loss record of 11–3–0. Placed directly into the finals of the gauntlet-style playoffs, they once again won the season, this time beating Hong Kong Esports 3-0 and automatically qualifying for the 2015 Season World Championship.

At Worlds, AHQ were seeded into Group B, along with Fnatic, Invictus Gaming, and Cloud9. They went 3-3, advancing to the playoffs after a tiebreaker victory over Cloud9 (giving the North American team their fourth loss in a row that day). Their World Championship run ended in the quarterfinals, where they lost against tournament favorites SK Telecom, earning a top eight finish.

== AHQ Korea ==
AHQ created a South Korean League of Legends sister team on 15 February 2013. The team was allegedly created specifically to throw games, which ultimately led to player Cheon "Promise" Min-Ki attempting suicide after making an online post detailing the team's match-fixing.

Awards and achievements
| Preceded by championship established | League of Legends Master Series winner Spring 2015 – Summer 2015; With: Ziv, Mountain, Westdoor, AN, Albis, GreenTea | Succeeded by Flash Wolves |
| Preceded by Taipei Assassins | Garena Premier League winner Summer 2013; With: Prydz, GarnetDevil, Westdoor, MrAlbis, GreenTea | Succeeded by Taipei Assassins |
