= 2026 LCP season =

- League: LCP
- Sport: League of Legends
- Duration: 16 January – 1 March (Split 1); 4 April – 7 June (Split 2); 25 July – 30 August (Split 3)
- Teams: 8

Split 1
- Champions: Team Secret Whales
- Runners-up: Relove Deep Cross Gaming
- Season MVP: Trần "Dire" Duy Đức (Team Secret Whales)

Split 2
- Champions: Team Secret Whales
- Runners-up: Relove Deep Cross Gaming
- Season MVP: Lê Văn "Hizto" Hoàng Hải (Team Secret Whales)

Split 3
- Champions: Team Secret Whales
- Runners-up: CTBC Flying Oyster
- Season MVP: Lê Văn "Hizto" Hoàng Hải (Team Secret Whales)

LCP seasons
- ← 2025 2027 →

The 2026 LCP season was the second season of the League of Legends Championship Pacific (LCP), an Asia-Pacific esports league for the video game League of Legends by developer Riot Games and tournament organizer Carry International. It consisted of eight teams participating in three splits, with each split qualifying teams to three international tournaments. The season began on 16 January and ended on 30 August.

Team Secret Whales won all three splits of the season, defeating Relove Deep Cross Gaming in the final of the first two splits, and CTBC Flying Oyster in the final split. Through this feat, the team qualified for all three international tournaments (First Stand Tournament, Mid-Season Invitational, World Championship), being one of four teams to do so across all six Tier 1 regions.

Aside from Team Secret Whales, Relove Deep Cross Gaming qualified for MSI 2026, while CTBC Flying Oyster and MVK Esports qualified for the 2026 World Championship as the second and third seeds respectively.

== League changes ==
=== Championship points ===
Starting in 2026, the LCP will utilize the championship points system in determining the second team to qualify for the Mid-Season Invitational and the third team to qualify for the League of Legends World Championship.

=== Playoff matches and side selection ===
Unlike the league's inaugural season where the first few playoff series were best-of-threes, all playoff matches in 2026 will be contested in best-of-five series. Side selection during the first game of each series will now be decided by a duos match as opposed to one-on-one solo matches from the previous season.

=== Teams ===
Three team changes occurred heading into the 2026 season. Chiefs Esports Club of Australia, one of the guest teams that participated in the 2025 LCP season, was relegated after losing to Deep Cross Gaming of Taiwan from the Pacific Championship Series (PCS) in the finals of the league's promotion and relegation free-for-all bracket. MGN Vikings Esports of Vietnam retained its spot in the league after beating Saigon Dino of the Vietnam Championship Series (VCS) in the regional merit match.

Prior to the start of the 2026 season, MGN Vikings Esports rebranded to MVK Esports and Deep Cross Gaming entered into a title sponsorship with Taiwanese care brand Relove. The team renamed to Relove Deep Cross Gaming.

On 18 November 2025, Riot Games announced that PSG Talon of Taiwan, one of the four LCP partners, was removed from the league, with Riot citing financial issues as the main reason why they were removed. This came after reports surfaced of the organization failing to pay their players and staff in a timely manner. Talon noted in a statement that these issues came from funding delays stemming from their most recent financing round. On 22 December, Riot Games announced that Ground Zero Gaming of Taiwan (formerly of Australia) would replace PSG Talon in the LCP for 2026 as a guest team, with Ground Zero required to field a roster from the PCS region.

== Guest teams ==
Five guest teams will compete in the 2026 season – Deep Cross Gaming and Ground Zero Gaming from Taiwan, Team Secret Whales and MVK Esports from Vietnam, and DetonatioN FocusMe from Japan. Up to three teams with the least amount of championship points will compete in a promotion and relegation tournament against the top teams from the Tier 2 leagues (currently consisting of the PCS, VCS, LJL and a "Wild Card" spot) based on their location.

== Split 1 ==
=== Format ===
Split 1 featured all eight (8) teams competing in a single-round robin tournament where all matches were played in best-of-threes, with the top six (6) teams qualifying for the playoffs. The playoffs were a hybrid double elimination bracket with best-of-five matches, with the winner of Split 1 qualifying to represent the league as its lone representative at the 2026 First Stand Tournament.

=== Regular season ===
Venue: LCP Arena, Taipei, Taiwan

Pos	Team	Pld	W	L	PCT	Qualification
1	Team Secret Whales	7	6	1	.857	Playoffs
2	Relove Deep Cross Gaming	7	6	1	.857	Playoffs
3	GAM Esports	7	4	3	.571	Playoffs
4	Ground Zero Gaming	7	4	3	.571	Playoffs
5	CTBC Flying Oyster	7	3	4	.429	Playoffs
6	SoftBank Hawks	7	3	4	.429	Playoffs
7	MVK Esports	7	2	5	.286	Eliminated
8	DetonatioN FocusMe	7	0	7	.000	Eliminated

Updated to match(es) played on 8 February 2026. Source: LoL Esports

=== Qualifying Series ===
As the highest-ranked team in Round 1, GAM Esports had the chance to select their opponents. Team Secret Whales also earned the right to select their opponents in Round 2 being the top seed.

==== Bracket ====
Venue: LCP Arena, Taipei, Taiwan

Upper quarterfinals
12 February
3	GAM Esports	0
6	SoftBank Hawks	3
13 February
4	Ground Zero Gaming	3
5	CTBC Flying Oyster	1

Upper semifinals
14 February
1	Team Secret Whales	3
6	SoftBank Hawks	1
15 February
2	Relove Deep Cross Gaming	3
4	Ground Zero Gaming	1
Lower semifinals
27 February
6	SoftBank Hawks	3
4	Ground Zero Gaming	1

Upper final
26 February
1	Team Secret Whales	3
2	Relove Deep Cross Gaming	2
Lower final
28 February
2	Relove Deep Cross Gaming	3
6	SoftBank Hawks	2

Final
1 March
1	Team Secret Whales	3
2	Relove Deep Cross Gaming	0

Source: LoL Esports

=== Awards ===
Award	Player	Team
Finals MVP	Dire	Team Secret Whales
Team of the Split	Evi	SoftBank Hawks
Team of the Split	Hizto	Team Secret Whales
Team of the Split	Dire	Team Secret Whales
Team of the Split	Eddie	Team Secret Whales
Team of the Split	ShiauC	Relove Deep Cross Gaming

== Split 2 ==
=== Format ===
Similar to Split 1, Split 2 had the same eight (8) teams competing in a single-round robin tournament where all matches were played in best-of-threes. The top six (6) teams qualified for the playoffs, applying a hybrid double-elimination bracket as with Split 1. All playoff matches were played in best-of-fives, with the winner of Split 2 qualifying for the 2026 Mid-Season Invitational as the region's first seed. The second team to qualify for MSI 2026 from the LCP was the team with the most number of championship points at the end of Split 2, and was being the region's second seed. Playoff seeding principles is also similar to Split 1.

=== Regular season ===
Venue: LCP Arena, Taipei, Taiwan

Pos	Team	Pld	W	L	PCT	Qualification
1	Team Secret Whales	7	7	0	1.000	Playoffs
2	GAM Esports	7	6	1	.857	Playoffs
3	MVK Esports	7	5	2	.714	Playoffs
4	SoftBank Hawks	7	4	3	.571	Playoffs
5	Relove Deep Cross Gaming	7	3	4	.429	Playoffs
6	CTBC Flying Oyster	7	2	5	.286	Playoffs
7	Ground Zero Gaming	7	1	6	.143	Eliminated
8	DetonatioN FocusMe	7	0	7	.000	Eliminated

Updated to match(es) played on 17 May 2026. Source: LoL Esports

=== Qualifying Series ===
As the highest-ranked team in Round 1, MVK Esports had the chance to select their opponents. Team Secret Whales also earned the right to select their opponents in Round 2 being the top seed.

==== Bracket ====
Venue: LCP Arena, Taipei, Taiwan

Upper quarterfinals
23 May
3	MVK Esports	3
6	CTBC Flying Oyster	2
24 May
4	SoftBank Hawks	0
5	Relove Deep Cross Gaming	3

Upper semifinals
29 May
1	Team Secret Whales	3
3	MVK Esports	0
30 May
2	GAM Esports	1
5	Relove Deep Cross Gaming	3
Lower semifinals
5 June
3	MVK Esports	0
2	GAM Esports	3

Upper final
31 May
1	Team Secret Whales	3
5	Relove Deep Cross Gaming	2
Lower final
6 June
5	Relove Deep Cross Gaming	3
2	GAM Esports	2

Final
7 June
1	Team Secret Whales	3
5	Relove Deep Cross Gaming	1

Source: LoL Esports

=== Awards ===
Award	Player	Team
Finals MVP	Hizto	Team Secret Whales
Season MVP	Hizto	Team Secret Whales
Team of the Split	Flauren	Relove Deep Cross Gaming
Team of the Split	Hizto	Team Secret Whales
Team of the Split	HongSuo	Relove Deep Cross Gaming
Team of the Split	Eddie	Team Secret Whales
Team of the Split	Bie	Team Secret Whales

== Split 3 ==
=== Format ===
The third split will follow a Swiss stage format consisting of best-of-three matches for the first two rounds and the 1–1 bracket, and best-of-five matches for qualification and elimination series. The teams that win three matches first will secure their spot in the playoffs, but seeding will be determined by a series of best-of-five seeding matches.

In between the 2–1 and 1–2 brackets, the team that lost in the 2–0 match will face the team that won in the 0–2 match. The outcome of the said series will have an impact in the final Swiss stage round and in the seeding matches for the playoffs, with the following scenarios:

- If the loser of the 2–1 match wins against the winner of the 1–2 match, that team will advance to the playoffs while the other team will be eliminated, and only one 2–2 bracket match will be played. In seeding matches for the playoffs, the two teams that finished 3–1 will face off in a series, with the loser automatically earning the third seed. The winner of said series will go up against the team that finished with a 3–0 record, with the winner earning the first seed and the loser getting the second seed. The team that finished with a 3–2 record will automatically secure the fourth seed. In addition, the two teams that were eliminated will also contest a seeding match, with the winner earning five (5) championship points.
- If the winner of the 1–2 match wins against the loser of the 2–1 match, both teams will advance to the 2–2 bracket, which will have two matches. In seeding matches for the playoffs, the team that finished with a 3–0 record will face the team that finished with a 3–1 record, with the winner securing the first seed and the loser getting the second seed. The two teams that were eliminated in the 2–2 bracket will also contest a seeding match, with the winner earning five (5) championship points.

The playoffs will be a double-elimination format, with all matches played in best-of-fives. The finalists of Split 3 will qualify for the 2026 League of Legends World Championship, with the Season Champion earning the first seed. The team that had the most number of championship points at the end of the season will also earn their spot in the tournament as the third seed.

=== Draw ===
For the first round of the Swiss stage, the top four (4) teams from the previous split will be drawn against the bottom four (4) teams. Teams with the same win-loss record will be drawn against each other in subsequent rounds, but teams are not allowed to play each other twice unless no other option is available.

1st draw pool

- SoftBank Hawks
- CTBC Flying Oyster
- Ground Zero Gaming
- DetonatioN FocusMe

2nd draw pool

- Team Secret Whales
- Relove Deep Cross Gaming
- GAM Esports
- MVK Esports

=== Swiss stage ===
Advanced to playoffs
Team Secret Whales
2–0	Advanced to playoffs
Team Secret Whales	3	MVK Esports
1–0	CTBC Flying Oyster	0	2–1	CTBC Flying Oyster
0–0	Team Secret Whales	2	Relove Deep Cross Gaming	2	Advanced to playoffs
SoftBank Hawks	0	MVK Esports	0	MVK Esports	3	GAM Esports
Team Secret Whales	2	CTBC Flying Oyster	2	1–1
CTBC Flying Oyster	2	GAM Esports	1	Relove Deep Cross Gaming	2	2–1/1–2	2–2
Relove Deep Cross Gaming	0	DetonatioN FocusMe	0	2–1	CTBC Flying Oyster	3	Relove Deep Cross Gaming	1
DetonatioN FocusMe	0	0–1	MVK Esports	2	1–2	Ground Zero Gaming	1	GAM Esports	3
GAM Esports	2	Relove Deep Cross Gaming	2	GAM Esports	0
Ground Zero Gaming	0	Ground Zero Gaming	1	1–2	Eliminated
MVK Esports	2	SoftBank Hawks	1	DetonatioN FocusMe	0	Relove Deep Cross Gaming
DetonatioN FocusMe	2	0–2	GAM Esports	3	Eliminated
SoftBank Hawks	0	DetonatioN FocusMe
Ground Zero Gaming	3	Ground Zero Gaming
Eliminated
SoftBank Hawks

Source: LoL Esports

=== Seeding matches ===
3rd Seed
14 August
3–1	MVK Esports	2
3–1	CTBC Flying Oyster	3

1st/2nd Seed
16 August
3–0	Team Secret Whales	2
3–1	CTBC Flying Oyster	3

1–3 Tie-breaker
15 August
DetonatioN FocusMe	0
Ground Zero Gaming	3

Source: LoL Esports

=== Playoffs ===
Venues:

- LCP Arena, Taipei, Taiwan
- Taipei Heping Basketball Gymnasium, Taipei, Taiwan (Lower Bracket Final and Finals)

Upper round 1
20 August
1	CTBC Flying Oyster	3
3	MVK Esports	0
21 August
2	Team Secret Whales	3
4	GAM Esports	1
Lower round 1
22 August
3	MVK Esports	3
4	GAM Esports	2

Upper final
23 August
1	CTBC Flying Oyster	0
2	Team Secret Whales	3
Lower final
29 August
1	CTBC Flying Oyster	3
3	MVK Esports	1

Final
30 August
2	Team Secret Whales	3
1	CTBC Flying Oyster	0

Source: LoL Esports

=== Awards ===
- Most Valuable Player: Hizto, Team Secret Whales
- Finals MVP: Hizto, Team Secret Whales
- All-Pros First Team:
  - T Pun, Team Secret Whales
  - J Hizto, Team Secret Whales
  - M Dire, Team Secret Whales
  - B Doggo, CTBC Flying Oyster
  - S Bie, Team Secret Whales
- All-Pros Second Team:
  - T Kiaya, GAM Esports
  - J Shad0w, CTBC Flying Oyster
  - M Pout, CTBC Flying Oyster
  - B Eddie, Team Secret Whales
  - S Taki, GAM Esports
- All-Pros Third Team:
  - T 1Jiang, Ground Zero Gaming
  - J Gury, MVK Esports
  - M Chika, MVK Esports
  - B Harky, MVK Esports
  - S Kino, CTBC Flying Oyster

== Championship points ==
Throughout the season, teams can gain championship points based on performance in their league. At the end of Splits 2 and 3, the teams with the most points that has't qualified through the playoffs will earn a spot at the following international event.

=== MSI 2026 qualification ===
Pos	Team	S1	S2	Total	Qualification
1	Team Secret Whales	37	AQ	AQ	Automatic qualification via Stage 2 playoffs
2	Relove Deep Cross Gaming	28	18	46	Guaranteed qualification via Championship Points
3	GAM Esports	8	28	36	
4	SoftBank Hawks	12	10	22	
5	MVK Esports	1	20	21	
6	Ground Zero Gaming	10	1	11	
7	CTBC Flying Oyster	3	2	5	
8	DetonatioN FocusMe	0	0	0	

Updated to match(es) played on 7 June 2026. Source:

=== World Championship qualification ===
Pos	Team	S1	S2	S3	Total	Qualification
1	Team Secret Whales	37	49	AQ	AQ	Automatic qualification via Stage 3 playoffs
2	CTBC Flying Oyster	3	2	AQ	AQ	Automatic qualification via Stage 3 playoffs
3	MVK Esports	1	20	55	76	Guaranteed qualification via Championship Points
4	GAM Esports	8	28	30	66	
5	Relove Deep Cross Gaming	28	18	15	61	
6	SoftBank Hawks	12	10	0	22	
7	Ground Zero Gaming	10	1	8	19	Qualification for Promotion Tournament Regional Merit
8	DetonatioN FocusMe	0	0	3	3	Qualification for Promotion Tournament Free-for-All

Updated to match(es) played on 29 August 2026. Source:

== Promotion and relegation ==
The promotion and relegation phase is a series of matches deciding promotion and relegation for teams into the 2027 LCP season. A total of seven teams take part in the Promotion Tournament – one each from the Pacific Championship Series (PCS), Vietnam Championship Series (VCS), and the League of Legends Japan League (LJL), the winners of both the FLASH Oceania and the LCP Wild Card Playoffs, and two guest teams from the 2026 LCP season depending on their championship points.

For the LCP Wild Card Playoffs, four teams qualified through winning their respective tournaments that served as qualifiers for the event – one each from the Indonesia/Malaysia/Singapore Qualifier, Philippines Qualifier, Thailand Qualifier, and the Regional Last Chance Qualifier.

On 21 September 2026, Riot Games announced that the LCP would change its format for 2027. Each team would reintegrate into their regional leagues which would then be used to qualify teams for the LCP. Teams that secure their status as an LCP team would receive a share of the Regional GRP in 2027, providing additional financial support next year.

=== Qualified teams ===
If a domestic team that would be in the Promotion Tournament is an academy team of a current LCP team, they cannot participate. The spot then goes to the highest-ranked non-academy team from that league.

Promotion Tournament

League/Tournament	Team	Path
League of Legends Championship Pacific	DetonatioN FocusMe	Guest teams
League of Legends Championship Pacific	Ground Zero Gaming	Guest teams
League of Legends Japan League	FENNEL	Summer Championship winner
Pacific Championship Series	Frank Esports	Summer split runner-up
Vietnam Championship Series	Saigon Warriors	Finals Stage 2 runner-up
FLASH Oceania	Team Gromp	Season Champion
LCP Wild Card Playoffs	Nothin'Here	Winner

LCP Wild Card Playoffs

Bold – indicates team that won the tournament.

Tournament	Team
Indonesia/Malaysia/Singapore Qualifier	Essences
Philippines Qualifier	West Point Esports
Thailand Qualifier	**Nothin'Here**
Regional Last Chance Qualifier	PART TIMERS

=== Format ===
LCP Wild Card Playoffs

The four teams competed in a double elimination bracket with best-of-five matches, and side selection was decided in a two-on-two match. The winner of the finals qualified for the LCP Promotion Tournament.

Promotion Tournament

The seven teams contest two guest spots, with each spot being determined differently. One slot is determined through the Free-For-All bracket, where five teams compete in a single-elimination bracket, with all matches being contested in best-of-fives. Another slot is contested through the Regional Merit match, where two teams compete in a single best-of-five series. The winner of the Free-For-All bracket and the winner of the Regional Merit match qualify as guest teams for the 2027 LCP season.

Teams that contested in the Free-For-All bracket cannot contest in Regional Merit.

=== LCP Wild Card Playoffs ===
Upper round 1
10 October
PART TIMERS	1
**West Point Esports**	**3**
10 October
Essences	2
**Nothin'Here**	**3**
Lower round 1
11 October
PART TIMERS	2
**Essences**	**3**

Upper final
11 October
West Point Esports	2
**Nothin'Here**	**3**
Lower final
12 October
West Point Esports	2
**Essences**	**3**

Final
13 October
**Nothin'Here**	**3**
Essences	2

=== Promotion Tournament ===
All matches are held at the VPS Arena in Ho Chi Minh City, Vietnam.

Regional Merit

Qualification Match
11 November
**Ground Zero Gaming**	**3**
Frank Esports	2

Free-For-All Bracket

Round 1
10 November
FENNEL	0
**Nothin'Here**	**3**
10 November
**Saigon Warriors**	**3**
Team Gromp	0

Round 2
12 November
Nothin'Here	0
**Saigon Warriors**	**3**

Qualification Match
13 November
DetonatioN FocusMe	1
**Saigon Warriors**	**3**
