= 2026 Mid-Season Invitational =

International esports competition

Tournament information
- Sport: League of Legends
- Location: Daejeon, South Korea
- Dates: June 28–July 12
- Administrator: Riot Games
- Venue: Daejeon Convention Center II
- Teams: 11

Final positions
- Champion: Hanwha Life Esports
- Runner-up: Bilibili Gaming
- MVP: Choi "Zeus" Woo-je (Hanwha Life Esports)

The 2026 Mid-Season Invitational was the eleventh iteration of the Mid-Season Invitational (MSI), a Riot Games–organized tournament for League of Legends, a multiplayer online battle arena video game. The tournament was played in Daejeon, South Korea from June 28 to July 12, 2026.

Gen.G of the League of Legends Champions Korea (LCK) were the two-time reigning champions, but failed to qualify for the event after losing to T1 in the 2026 LCK Road to MSI qualification tournament.

Hanwha Life Esports of the LCK won the tournament after defeating Bilibili Gaming of the League of Legends Pro League (LPL) with a 3–2 scoreline in the grand finals. It was the third consecutive year a team from the LCK won the Mid-Season Invitational, and the fifth time overall an LCK team won the tournament (tied with the LPL in tournament wins of all time). The finals MVP was awarded to Choi "Zeus" Woo-je of Hanwha Life Esports, who alongside Kim "Zeka" Geon-woo, became the first players to win all three major international titles in League of Legends esports.

During the final day of the event, Riot Games announced the upcoming release of League of Legends Classic game mode for the 29th July 2026, with a showmatch played before the grand finals that featured prominent internet personalities such as Yiliang "Doublelift" Peng and William "Scarra" Li.

== Host selection ==
In a development update video published by Riot Games on 8 January 2025 to begin that year's competitive season, Riot Games announced that South Korea will host the tournament. Daejeon was named as the host city of MSI 2026 on 7 November 2025 during the media day for the 2025 League of Legends World Championship final in Chengdu, China. It will be the second time South Korea hosts MSI, the first being the 2022 edition which was held in Busan.

== Venue ==
During the finals of the 2026 First Stand Tournament in São Paulo, Brazil on 22 March 2026, Riot Games announced that the Daejeon Convention Center was chosen to host the tournament, which had previously hosted the 2023 LCK Summer Finals weekend.

Daejeon, South Korea
| Play-in stage | Bracket stage |
|---|---|
Daejeon Convention Center II
2026 Mid-Season Invitational is located in South Korea

== Qualification ==
The League of Legends Champions Korea (LCK), League of Legends Pro League (LPL), League of Legends EMEA Championship (LEC), the League Championship Series (LCS), and the League of Legends Championship Pacific (LCP) sent two qualified teams each, while the Campeonato Brasileiro de League of Legends (CBLOL) sent one qualified team. The LCS and CBLOL returned to MSI for the first time since 2024 after the League of Legends Championship of The Americas (LTA), which briefly replaced them, was discontinued after the 2025 season.

=== Qualified teams ===
On 10 May 2026, Team Secret Whales of the LCP became the first team to qualify for the tournament by virtue of securing enough championship points to finish in the top two as of the second split. G2 Esports of the LEC followed suit on 25 May after winning in the upper bracket final of the league's spring playoffs. The LCP's Relove Deep Cross Gaming, the LEC's Karmine Corp, and the CBLOL's FURIA, completed the list of qualified teams in their respective regions on 6 June. The day after, Top Esports of the LPL, and LYON of the LCS became the first qualified team from their respective regions. The LCK's Hanwha Life Esports advanced to the tournament on 12 June, with Bilibili Gaming and Team Liquid Alienware completing the LPL's and the LCS's representatives the next day, respectively. T1 secured qualification on 14 June to finalize the list of all qualified teams.

Starting in the bracket stage
| Region | League | Path | Team |
|---|---|---|---|
| Brazil; Southern Latin America | CBLOL | Split 1 champion | FURIA |
| South Korea | LCK | Road to MSI Match 1 winner | Hanwha Life Esports |
| Asia-Pacific | LCP | Split 2 champion | Team Secret Whales |
| North America; Northern Latin America | LCS | Spring Split champion | LYON |
| EMEA | LEC | Spring Split champion | G2 Esports |
| China | LPL | Split 2 champion | Bilibili Gaming |
| China | LPL | Split 2 runner-up | Top Esports |
Starting in the play-in stage
| Region | League | Path | Team |
| South Korea | LCK | Road to MSI Match 2 winner | T1 |
| Asia-Pacific | LCP | Most Championship points as of Split 2 (Note: Excluding the Split 2 champions) | Relove Deep Cross Gaming |
| North America; Northern Latin America | LCS | Spring Split runner-up | Team Liquid Alienware |
| EMEA | LEC | Spring Split runner-up | Karmine Corp |

== Format ==
Like prior years, the tournament was split into a play-in stage and a bracket stage, albeit with changes. In the play-in stage, four (4) teams, those being the second seeds from the LCK, LCP, LCS, and LEC, were placed into a double-elimination bracket consisting entirely of best-of-fives. The winner of the play-in stage advanced to the bracket stage. In the eight (8) team bracket stage, the play-in stage winner, the first and second seeds from the LPL (by virtue of being the winning region of the 2026 First Stand Tournament) and the first seeds from all other regions played in a double elimination best-of-five bracket. As in prior years, the winner of MSI qualified automatically for the 2026 World Championship should they qualify for their region's third split playoffs, while the runner-up region also gained an additional spot in the tournament.

== Play-in stage ==
- Date and time: 28 June–1 July, began at 17:00 KST (08:00 UTC)
  - Excluding games scheduled on June 28–29, which began at 12:00 KST (03:00 UTC).
- Four teams placed in a GSL-style double-elimination format
- Seeding based on results from the 2026 First Stand Tournament
  - 2nd place: LEC; 3rd place: LCK; 4th place: LCS; 5th place: LCP
- All matches are best-of-five.

=== Bracket ===
Round 1
June 28, 12:00 KST
T1 | 3
Team Liquid Alienware | 0
June 28, 17:00 KST
Karmine Corp | 3
Relove Deep Cross Gaming | 0
Lower Round 1
June 29, 17:00 KST
Team Liquid Alienware | 3
Relove Deep Cross Gaming | 0

Round 2
June 29, 12:00 KST
T1 | 3
Karmine Corp | 0
Lower Round 2
June 30, 17:00 KST
Karmine Corp | 0
Team Liquid Alienware | 3

Qualification match
July 1, 17:00 KST
T1 | 3
Team Liquid Alienware | 0

Source: LoL Esports

| Round 1 Match 1 | June 28 | T1 | 3 | – | 0 | Team Liquid Alienware | Daejeon, South Korea |
| | 12:00 (UTC+9) | | | | | | Daejeon Convention Center II |
| | | K/D/A: 25/12/49; Gold: 60.2K; Turrets: 9 Drakes: 2 Elder Dragons: 0 Barons: 1 Rift Heralds: 1 Voidgrubs: 2 | Game 1; 26:08; T1 leads series 1–0 | | | K/D/A: 12/25/24; Gold: 49.2K; Turrets: 2 Drakes: 1 Elder Dragons: 0 Barons: 0 Rift Heralds: 0 Voidgrubs: 1 | |
| | | K/D/A: 16/22/32; Gold: 72.3K; Turrets: 6 Drakes: 3 Elder Dragons: 0 Barons: 2 Rift Heralds: 0 Voidgrubs: 0 | Game 2; 36:11; T1 leads series 2–0 | | | K/D/A: 22/16/53; Gold: 67.9K; Turrets: 4 Drakes: 3 Elder Dragons: 0 Barons: 0 Rift Heralds: 1 Voidgrubs: 3 | |
| | | K/D/A: 14/12/34; Gold: 57.6K; Turrets: 6 Drakes: 4 Elder Dragons: 0 Barons: 0 Rift Heralds: 1 Voidgrubs: 3 | Game 3; 29:25; T1 wins series 3–0 | | | K/D/A: 12/14/25; Gold: 53.2K; Turrets: 2 Drakes: 0 Elder Dragons: 0 Barons: 0 Rift Heralds: 0 Voidgrubs: 0 | |

| Round 1 Match 2 | June 28 | Karmine Corp | 3 | – | 0 | Relove Deep Cross Gaming | Daejeon, South Korea |
| | 17:00 (UTC+9) | | | | | | Daejeon Convention Center II |
| | | K/D/A: 23/12/60; Gold: 68.0K; Turrets: 7 Drakes: 3 Elder Dragons: 0 Barons: 0 Rift Heralds: 0 Voidgrubs: 0 | Game 1; 31:50; KC leads series 1–0 | | | K/D/A: 12/23/27; Gold: 55.7K; Turrets: 2 Drakes: 1 Elder Dragons: 0 Barons: 1 Rift Heralds: 1 Voidgrubs: 3 | |
| | | K/D/A: 31/3/65; Gold: 61.1K; Turrets: 10; Drakes: 4 Elder Dragons: 0 Barons: 1 Rift Heralds: 1 Voidgrubs: 3 | Game 2; 25:54; KC leads series 2–0 | | | K/D/A: 3/31/10; Gold: 40.2K; Turrets: 1 Drakes: 0 Elder Dragons: 0 Barons: 0 Rift Heralds: 0 Voidgrubs: 0 | |
| | | K/D/A: 25/14/52; Gold: 74.8K; Turrets: 10; Drakes: 3 Elder Dragons: 0 Barons: 1 Rift Heralds: 1 Voidgrubs: 0 | Game 3; 33:29; KC wins series 3–0 | | | K/D/A: 14/25/26; Gold: 66.9K; Turrets: 2 Drakes: 2 Elder Dragons: 0 Barons: 1 Rift Heralds: 0 Voidgrubs: 3 | |

| Round 2 Match 3 | June 29 | T1 | 3 | – | 0 | Karmine Corp | Daejeon, South Korea |
| | 12:00 (UTC+9) | | | | | | Daejeon Convention Center II |
| | | K/D/A: 27/14/42; Gold: 70.0K; Turrets: 11; Drakes: 4 Elder Dragons: 0 Barons: 1 Rift Heralds: 1 Voidgrubs: 3 | Game 1; 30:43; T1 leads series 1–0 | | | K/D/A: 14/27/31; Gold: 56.3K; Turrets: 1 Drakes: 0 Elder Dragons: 0 Barons: 0 Rift Heralds: 0 Voidgrubs: 0 | |
| | | K/D/A: 27/23/66; Gold: 76.0K; Turrets: 9 Drakes: 1 Elder Dragons: 0 Barons: 2 Rift Heralds: 0 Voidgrubs: 3 | Game 2; 35:17; T1 leads series 2–0 | | | K/D/A: 23/27/31; Gold: 70.6K; Turrets: 3 Drakes: 4 Elder Dragons: 0 Barons: 0 Rift Heralds: 1 Voidgrubs: 0 | |
| | | K/D/A: 17/12/44; Gold: 58.1K; Turrets: 9 Drakes: 3 Elder Dragons: 0 Barons: 0 Rift Heralds: 1 Voidgrubs: 1 | Game 3; 27:24; T1 wins series 3–0 | | | K/D/A: 12/17/22; Gold: 51.9K; Turrets: 5 Drakes: 1 Elder Dragons: 0 Barons: 1 Rift Heralds: 0 Voidgrubs: 2 | |

| Lower Round 1 Match 4 | June 29 | Team Liquid Alienware | 3 | – | 0 | Relove Deep Cross Gaming | Daejeon, South Korea |
| | 17:00 (UTC+9) | | | | | | Daejeon Convention Center II |
| | | K/D/A: 20/10/45; Gold: 71.6K; Turrets: 10; Drakes: 4 Elder Dragons: 0 Barons: 2 Rift Heralds: 1 Voidgrubs: 2 | Game 1; 33:35; TLAW leads series 1–0 | | | K/D/A: 10/20/20; Gold: 59.3K; Turrets: 0 Drakes: 1 Elder Dragons: 0 Barons: 0 Rift Heralds: 0 Voidgrubs: 1 | |
| | | K/D/A: 25/17/64; Gold: 70.4K; Turrets: 11; Drakes: 2 Elder Dragons: 0 Barons: 1 Rift Heralds: 0 Voidgrubs: 0 | Game 2; 32:32; TLAW leads series 2–0 | | | K/D/A: 17/25/41; Gold: 64.2K; Turrets: 2 Drakes: 3 Elder Dragons: 0 Barons: 0 Rift Heralds: 1 Voidgrubs: 3 | |
| | | K/D/A: 22/11/34; Gold: 57.2K; Turrets: 9 Drakes: 3 Elder Dragons: 0 Barons: 1 Rift Heralds: 1 Voidgrubs: 3 | Game 3; 25:13; TLAW wins series 3–0 | | | K/D/A: 11/22/12; Gold: 47.0K; Turrets: 2 Drakes: 1 Elder Dragons: 0 Barons: 0 Rift Heralds: 0 Voidgrubs: 0 | |

| Lower Round 2 Match 5 | June 30 | Karmine Corp | 0 | – | 3 | Team Liquid Alienware | Daejeon, South Korea |
| | 17:00 (UTC+9) | | | | | | Daejeon Convention Center II |
| | | K/D/A: 7/18/13; Gold: 49.4K; Turrets: 2 Drakes: 2 Elder Dragons: 0 Barons: 0 Rift Heralds: 1 Voidgrubs: 0 | Game 1; 29:41; TLAW leads series 1–0 | | | K/D/A: 18/7/43; Gold: 58.8K; Turrets: 7 Drakes: 2 Elder Dragons: 0 Barons: 1 Rift Heralds: 0 Voidgrubs: 3 | |
| | | K/D/A: 17/23/45; Gold: 64.7K; Turrets: 2 Drakes: 1 Elder Dragons: 0 Barons: 0 Rift Heralds: 0 Voidgrubs: 2 | Game 2; 35:50; TLAW leads series 2–0 | | | K/D/A: 23/17/44; Gold: 71.8K; Turrets: 7 Drakes: 4 Elder Dragons: 1 Barons: 1 Rift Heralds: 1 Voidgrubs: 1 | |
| | | K/D/A: 9/23/19; Gold: 64.3K; Turrets: 2 Drakes: 3 Elder Dragons: 0 Barons: 0 Rift Heralds: 0 Voidgrubs: 0 | Game 3; 35:10; TLAW wins series 3–0 | | | K/D/A: 23/9/52; Gold: 72.8K; Turrets: 9 Drakes: 3 Elder Dragons: 0 Barons: 1 Rift Heralds: 1 Voidgrubs: 3 | |

| Qualification match Match 6 | July 1 | T1 | 3 | – | 0 | Team Liquid Alienware | Daejeon, South Korea |
| | 17:00 (UTC+9) | | | | | | Daejeon Convention Center II |
| | | K/D/A: 21/11/55; Gold: 62.7K; Turrets: 11; Drakes: 2 Elder Dragons: 0 Barons: 1 Rift Heralds: 0 Voidgrubs: 3 | Game 1; 27:35; T1 leads series 1–0 | | | K/D/A: 11/21/25; Gold: 49.9K; Turrets: 2 Drakes: 1 Elder Dragons: 0 Barons: 0 Rift Heralds: 1 Voidgrubs: 0 | |
| | | K/D/A: 29/32/68; Gold: 87.4K; Turrets: 9 Drakes: 4 Elder Dragons: 0 Barons: 2 Rift Heralds: 1 Voidgrubs: 3 | Game 2; 41:03; T1 leads series 2–0 | | | K/D/A: 31/29/79; Gold: 80.4K; Turrets: 4 Drakes: 3 Elder Dragons: 0 Barons: 1 Rift Heralds: 0 Voidgrubs: 0 | |
| | | K/D/A: 17/5/41; Gold: 53.0K; Turrets: 8 Drakes: 2 Elder Dragons: 0 Barons: 1 Rift Heralds: 1 Voidgrubs: 3 | Game 3; 23:36; T1 wins series 3–0 | | | K/D/A: 5/17/7; Gold: 39.3K; Turrets: 1 Drakes: 1 Elder Dragons: 0 Barons: 0 Rift Heralds: 0 Voidgrubs: 0 | |

== Bracket stage ==
=== Draw ===
Following the conclusion of the play-in stage, a draw was originally scheduled to be conducted for the bracket stage. The eight qualified teams were divided into the following four tiers:

Tier 1

- Bilibili Gaming
- G2 Esports

Tier 2

- Hanwha Life Esports
- LYON

Tier 3

- Team Secret Whales
- FURIA

Tier 4

- Top Esports
- T1

As T1 was able to qualify for the bracket stage, no draw was conducted to ensure no intra-regional matches can take place in the first rounds of both upper and lower brackets, and the first round of the latter. Hence, Hanwha Life Esports and T1 of the LCK, and Bilibili Gaming and Top Esports of the LPL are in opposite brackets each.

=== Bracket ===
- Date and time: July 3–12, began at 12:00 KST (03:00 UTC)
  - Excluding games scheduled on July 9–11 and July 12, which began at 17:00 KST (08:00 UTC) and 15:00 KST (06:00 UTC), respectively.
- Eight teams were drawn into four tiers where teams in Tier 1 will face teams from Tier 4, while teams from Tier 2 went up against teams from Tier 3
- Teams from the same region were to be placed on opposite bracket sides
- Double elimination; all matches are best-of-five.

Upper Round 1 | Upper Round 2 | Upper Final | Grand Final
July 3, 12:00 KST
Hanwha Life Esports | 3
July 5, 17:00 KST
Team Secret Whales | 0
Hanwha Life Esports | 3
July 3, 17:00 KST
G2 Esports | 0
G2 Esports | 3
July 9, 17:00 KST
Top Esports | 2
Hanwha Life Esports | 1
July 4, 12:00 KST
Bilibili Gaming | 3
LYON | 3
July 6, 12:00 KST
FURIA | 0
LYON | 0
July 4, 17:00 KST
Bilibili Gaming | 3
Bilibili Gaming | 3 | July 12, 15:00 KST
T1 | 2 | Bilibili Gaming | 2
Hanwha Life Esports | 3
Lower Round 1 | Lower Round 2 | Lower Round 3 | Lower Final
July 8, 12:00 KST
July 5, 12:00 KST | LYON | 3 | July 11, 17:00 KST
Team Secret Whales | 3 | Team Secret Whales | 0 | July 10, 17:00 KST | Hanwha Life Esports | 3
Top Esports | 1 | LYON | 3 | LYON | 2
July 8, 17:00 KST | G2 Esports | 0
July 6, 17:00 KST | G2 Esports | 3
FURIA | 0 | T1 | 1
T1 | 3

Source: LoL Esports

| Upper Round 1 Match 7 | July 3 | Hanwha Life Esports | 3 | – | 0 | Team Secret Whales | Daejeon, South Korea |
| | 12:00 (UTC+9) | | | | | | Daejeon Convention Center II |
| | | K/D/A: 12/4/24; Gold: 56.0K; Turrets: 11; Drakes: 2 Elder Dragons: 0 Barons: 1 Rift Heralds: 1 Voidgrubs: 3 | Game 1; 26:24; HLE leads series 1–0 | | | K/D/A: 4/12/13; Gold: 43.8K; Turrets: 1 Drakes: 1 Elder Dragons: 0 Barons: 0 Rift Heralds: 0 Voidgrubs: 0 | |
| | | K/D/A: 22/17/38; Gold: 62.0K; Turrets: 9 Drakes: 3 Elder Dragons: 0 Barons: 0 Rift Heralds: 1 Voidgrubs: 3 | Game 2; 28:14; HLE leads series 2–0 | | | K/D/A: 17/22/33; Gold: 50.1K; Turrets: 0 Drakes: 1 Elder Dragons: 0 Barons: 0 Rift Heralds: 0 Voidgrubs: 0 | |
| | | K/D/A: 18/9/43; Gold: 64.5K; Turrets: 9 Drakes: 1 Elder Dragons: 0 Barons: 1 Rift Heralds: 0 Voidgrubs: 3 | Game 3; 30:03; HLE wins series 3–0 | | | K/D/A: 9/18/15; Gold: 51.7K; Turrets: 2 Drakes: 2 Elder Dragons: 0 Barons: 0 Rift Heralds: 1 Voidgrubs: 0 | |

| Upper Round 1 Match 8 | July 3 | G2 Esports | 3 | – | 2 | Top Esports | Daejeon, South Korea |
| | 17:00 (UTC+9) | | | | | | Daejeon Convention Center II |
| | | K/D/A: 8/17/22; Gold: 58.4K; Turrets: 2 Drakes: 2 Elder Dragons: 0 Barons: 0 Rift Heralds: 0 Voidgrubs: 0 | Game 1; 34:04; TES leads series 1–0 | | | K/D/A: 17/8/28; Gold: 70.0K; Turrets: 11; Drakes: 3 Elder Dragons: 0 Barons: 1 Rift Heralds: 1 Voidgrubs: 3 | |
| | | K/D/A: 11/27/21; Gold: 56.1K; Turrets: 2 Drakes: 1 Elder Dragons: 0 Barons: 0 Rift Heralds: 1 Voidgrubs: 0 | Game 2; 32:03; TES leads series 2–0 | | | K/D/A: 27/11/62; Gold: 69.0K; Turrets: 8 Drakes: 3 Elder Dragons: 0 Barons: 2 Rift Heralds: 0 Voidgrubs: 3 | |
| | | K/D/A: 29/10/76; Gold: 59.9K; Turrets: 9 Drakes: 4 Elder Dragons: 0 Barons: 1 Rift Heralds: 0 Voidgrubs: 0 | Game 3; 27:04; TES leads series 2–1 | | | K/D/A: 10/29/21; Gold: 46.5K; Turrets: 2 Drakes: 0 Elder Dragons: 0 Barons: 0 Rift Heralds: 1 Voidgrubs: 3 | |
| | | K/D/A: 14/12/25; Gold: 79.3K; Turrets: 12; Drakes: 3 Elder Dragons: 0 Barons: 2 Rift Heralds: 1 Voidgrubs: 3 | Game 4; 41:16; Series tied 2–2 | | | K/D/A: 12/14/24; Gold: 71.6K; Turrets: 3 Drakes: 3 Elder Dragons: 0 Barons: 0 Rift Heralds: 0 Voidgrubs: 0 | |
| | | K/D/A: 30/15/75; Gold: 75.5K; Turrets: 11; Drakes: 3 Elder Dragons: 0 Barons: 2 Rift Heralds: 1 Voidgrubs: 3 | Game 5; 36:10; G2 wins series 3–2 | | | K/D/A: 14/30/23; Gold: 64.4K; Turrets: 1 Drakes: 2 Elder Dragons: 0 Barons: 0 Rift Heralds: 0 Voidgrubs: 0 | |

| Upper Round 1 Match 9 | July 4 | LYON | 3 | – | 0 | FURIA | Daejeon, South Korea |
| | 12:00 (UTC+9) | | | | | | Daejeon Convention Center II |
| | | K/D/A: 23/26/51; Gold: 88.6K; Turrets: 8 Drakes: 2 Elder Dragons: 1 Barons: 0 Rift Heralds: 0 Voidgrubs: 2 | Game 1; 43:59; LYON leads series 1–0 | | | K/D/A: 26/23/56; Gold: 83.9K; Turrets: 5 Drakes: 4 Elder Dragons: 0 Barons: 3 Rift Heralds: 1 Voidgrubs: 1 | |
| | | K/D/A: 23/22/49; Gold: 76.2K; Turrets: 9 Drakes: 3 Elder Dragons: 0 Barons: 1 Rift Heralds: 0 Voidgrubs: 3 | Game 2; 37:44; LYON leads series 2–0 | | | K/D/A: 22/23/59; Gold: 67.5K; Turrets: 2 Drakes: 3 Elder Dragons: 0 Barons: 0 Rift Heralds: 1 Voidgrubs: 0 | |
| | | K/D/A: 21/6/52; Gold: 61.8K; Turrets: 11; Drakes: 2 Elder Dragons: 0 Barons: 1 Rift Heralds: 0 Voidgrubs: 0 | Game 3; 28:12; LYON wins series 3–0 | | | K/D/A: 6/21/11; Gold: 46.4K; Turrets: 2 Drakes: 2 Elder Dragons: 0 Barons: 0 Rift Heralds: 1 Voidgrubs: 3 | |

| Upper Round 1 Match 10 | July 4 | Bilibili Gaming | 3 | – | 2 | T1 | Daejeon, South Korea |
| | 17:00 (UTC+9) | | | | | | Daejeon Convention Center II |
| | | K/D/A: 15/16/41; Gold: 75.7K; Turrets: 4 Drakes: 3 Elder Dragons: 0 Barons: 1 Rift Heralds: 0 Voidgrubs: 0 | Game 1; 41:16; T1 leads series 1–0 | | | K/D/A: 16/15/24; Gold: 81.4K; Turrets: 9 Drakes: 3 Elder Dragons: 0 Barons: 2 Rift Heralds: 1 Voidgrubs: 3 | |
| | | K/D/A: 20/7/46; Gold: 62.2K; Turrets: 9 Drakes: 2 Elder Dragons: 0 Barons: 1 Rift Heralds: 1 Voidgrubs: 2 | Game 2; 41:16; Series tied 1–1 | | | K/D/A: 7/20/11; Gold: 51.6K; Turrets: 2 Drakes: 2 Elder Dragons: 0 Barons: 0 Rift Heralds: 0 Voidgrubs: 1 | |
| | | K/D/A: 14/3/34; Gold: 70.0K; Turrets: 10; Drakes: 4 Elder Dragons: 0 Barons: 1 Rift Heralds: 0 Voidgrubs: 1 | Game 3; 33:57; BLG leads series 2–1 | | | K/D/A: 3/14/5; Gold: 55.2K; Turrets: 2 Drakes: 0 Elder Dragons: 0 Barons: 0 Rift Heralds: 1 Voidgrubs: 2 | |
| | | K/D/A: 10/23/20; Gold: 59.9K; Turrets: 3 Drakes: 0 Elder Dragons: 0 Barons: 0 Rift Heralds: 0 Voidgrubs: 3 | Game 4; 33:17; Series tied 2–2 | | | K/D/A: 23/10/46; Gold: 72.2K; Turrets: 9 Drakes: 4 Elder Dragons: 1 Barons: 2 Rift Heralds: 1 Voidgrubs: 0 | |
| | | K/D/A: 10/3/26; Gold: 55.5K; Turrets: 9 Drakes: 4 Elder Dragons: 0 Barons: 1 Rift Heralds: 1 Voidgrubs: 1 | Game 5; 26:57; BLG wins series 3–2 | | | K/D/A: 3/10/5; Gold: 47.5K; Turrets: 3 Drakes: 0 Elder Dragons: 0 Barons: 0 Rift Heralds: 0 Voidgrubs: 2 | |

| Lower Round 1 Match 11 | July 5 | Team Secret Whales | 3 | – | 1 | Top Esports | Daejeon, South Korea |
| | 12:00 (UTC+9) | | | | | | Daejeon Convention Center II |
| | | K/D/A: 29/6/76; Gold: 68.8K; Turrets: 9 Drakes: 4 Elder Dragons: 0 Barons: 1 Rift Heralds: 1 Voidgrubs: 0 | Game 1; 32:07; TSW leads series 1–0 | | | K/D/A: 6/29/18; Gold: 54.9K; Turrets: 4 Drakes: 1 Elder Dragons: 0 Barons: 1 Rift Heralds: 0 Voidgrubs: 3 | |
| | | K/D/A: 3/15/6; Gold: 43.7K; Turrets: 1 Drakes: 1 Elder Dragons: 0 Barons: 0 Rift Heralds: 1 Voidgrubs: 1 | Game 2; 28:19; Series tied 1–1 | | | K/D/A: 15/3/39; Gold: 59.8K; Turrets: 9 Drakes: 4 Elder Dragons: 0 Barons: 1 Rift Heralds: 0 Voidgrubs: 2 | |
| | | K/D/A: 19/5/47; Gold: 63.9K; Turrets: 8 Drakes: 4 Elder Dragons: 0 Barons: 2 Rift Heralds: 1 Voidgrubs: 0 | Game 3; 30:56; TSW leads series 2–1 | | | K/D/A: 5/19/11; Gold: 52.8K; Turrets: 3 Drakes: 1 Elder Dragons: 0 Barons: 0 Rift Heralds: 0 Voidgrubs: 3 | |
| | | K/D/A: 21/14/32; Gold: 82.0K; Turrets: 9 Drakes: 3 Elder Dragons: 0 Barons: 2 Rift Heralds: 1 Voidgrubs: 3 | Game 4; 41:55; TSW wins series 3–1 | | | K/D/A: 14/21/14; Gold: 79.0K; Turrets: 7 Drakes: 3 Elder Dragons: 0 Barons: 0 Rift Heralds: 0 Voidgrubs: 0 | |

| Upper Round 2 Match 12 | July 5 | Hanwha Life Esports | 3 | – | 0 | G2 Esports | Daejeon, South Korea |
| | 17:00 (UTC+9) | | | | | | Daejeon Convention Center II |
| | | K/D/A: 27/19/60; Gold: 72.5K; Turrets: 10; Drakes: 4 Elder Dragons: 0 Barons: 1 Rift Heralds: 1 Voidgrubs: 0 | Game 1; 33:12; HLE leads series 1–0 | | | K/D/A: 19/27/50; Gold: 62.7K; Turrets: 3 Drakes: 1 Elder Dragons: 0 Barons: 0 Rift Heralds: 0 Voidgrubs: 3 | |
| | | K/D/A: 29/7/72; Gold: 55.2K; Turrets: 9 Drakes: 3 Elder Dragons: 0 Barons: 1 Rift Heralds: 1 Voidgrubs: 3 | Game 2; 24:24; HLE leads series 2–0 | | | K/D/A: 7/29/13; Gold: 42.9K; Turrets: 2 Drakes: 0 Elder Dragons: 0 Barons: 0 Rift Heralds: 0 Voidgrubs: 0 | |
| | | K/D/A: 33/7/60; Gold: 58.4K; Turrets: 10; Drakes: 1 Elder Dragons: 0 Barons: 1 Rift Heralds: 1 Voidgrubs: 0 | Game 3; 25:06; HLE wins series 3–0 | | | K/D/A: 7/33/14; Gold: 42.2K; Turrets: 0 Drakes: 1 Elder Dragons: 0 Barons: 0 Rift Heralds: 0 Voidgrubs: 3 | |

| Upper Round 2 Match 13 | July 6 | LYON | 0 | – | 3 | Bilibili Gaming | Daejeon, South Korea |
| | 12:00 (UTC+9) | | | | | | Daejeon Convention Center II |
| | | K/D/A: 11/12/15; Gold: 58.9K; Turrets: 2 Drakes: 3 Elder Dragons: 0 Barons: 0 Rift Heralds: 0 Voidgrubs: 3 | Game 1; 32:02; BLG leads series 1–0 | | | K/D/A: 12/11/29; Gold: 64.2K; Turrets: 7 Drakes: 1 Elder Dragons: 0 Barons: 1 Rift Heralds: 1 Voidgrubs: 0 | |
| | | K/D/A: 18/31/41; Gold: 55.4K; Turrets: 3 Drakes: 0 Elder Dragons: 0 Barons: 0 Rift Heralds: 1 Voidgrubs: 3 | Game 2; 28:30; BLG leads series 2–0 | | | K/D/A: 31/18/72; Gold: 66.7K; Turrets: 9 Drakes: 3 Elder Dragons: 0 Barons: 1 Rift Heralds: 0 Voidgrubs: 0 | |
| | | K/D/A: 13/15/26; Gold: 74.2K; Turrets: 3 Drakes: 4 Elder Dragons: 0 Barons: 1 Rift Heralds: 0 Voidgrubs: 0 | Game 3; 39:26; BLG wins series 3–0 | | | K/D/A: 15/13/38; Gold: 80.0K; Turrets: 10; Drakes: 3 Elder Dragons: 0 Barons: 1 Rift Heralds: 1 Voidgrubs: 3 | |

| Lower Round 1 Match 14 | July 6 | FURIA | 0 | – | 3 | T1 | Daejeon, South Korea |
| | 17:00 (UTC+9) | | | | | | Daejeon Convention Center II |
| | | K/D/A: 8/15/14; Gold: 54.2K; Turrets: 1 Drakes: 2 Elder Dragons: 0 Barons: 0 Rift Heralds: 0 Voidgrubs: 0 | Game 1; 33:49; T1 leads series 1–0 | | | K/D/A: 15/8/40; Gold: 67.8K; Turrets: 10; Drakes: 3 Elder Dragons: 0 Barons: 0 Rift Heralds: 1 Voidgrubs: 3 | |
| | | K/D/A: 8/14/15; Gold: 48.2K; Turrets: 1 Drakes: 3 Elder Dragons: 0 Barons: 0 Rift Heralds: 0 Voidgrubs: 3 | Game 2; 29:17; T1 leads series 2–0 | | | K/D/A: 14/8/38; Gold: 57.4K; Turrets: 8 Drakes: 1 Elder Dragons: 0 Barons: 1 Rift Heralds: 1 Voidgrubs: 0 | |
| | | K/D/A: 23/21/59; Gold: 64.3K; Turrets: 3 Drakes: 2 Elder Dragons: 0 Barons: 0 Rift Heralds: 0 Voidgrubs: 2 | Game 3; 35:16; T1 wins series 3–0 | | | K/D/A: 21/23/53; Gold: 72.3K; Turrets: 9 Drakes: 3 Elder Dragons: 0 Barons: 2 Rift Heralds: 1 Voidgrubs: 1 | |

| Lower Round 2 Match 15 | July 8 | LYON | 3 | – | 0 | Team Secret Whales | Daejeon, South Korea |
| | 12:00 (UTC+9) | | | | | | Daejeon Convention Center II |
| | | K/D/A: 13/9/36; Gold: 57.1K; Turrets: 9 Drakes: 1 Elder Dragons: 0 Barons: 1 Rift Heralds: 0 Voidgrubs: 3 | Game 1; 27:44; LYON leads series 1–0 | | | K/D/A: 9/13/17; Gold: 49.5K; Turrets: 3 Drakes: 3 Elder Dragons: 0 Barons: 0 Rift Heralds: 1 Voidgrubs: 0 | |
| | | K/D/A: 16/8/32; Gold: 62.2K; Turrets: 8 Drakes: 2 Elder Dragons: 0 Barons: 1 Rift Heralds: 0 Voidgrubs: 2 | Game 2; 29:11; LYON leads series 2–0 | | | K/D/A: 8/16/12; Gold: 49.8K; Turrets: 1 Drakes: 1 Elder Dragons: 0 Barons: 0 Rift Heralds: 1 Voidgrubs: 1 | |
| | | K/D/A: 17/11/36; Gold: 67.2K; Turrets: 9 Drakes: 2 Elder Dragons: 0 Barons: 0 Rift Heralds: 1 Voidgrubs: 1 | Game 3; 33:30; LYON wins series 3–0 | | | K/D/A: 11/17/23; Gold: 58.6K; Turrets: 1 Drakes: 2 Elder Dragons: 0 Barons: 0 Rift Heralds: 0 Voidgrubs: 2 | |

| Lower Round 2 Match 16 | July 8 | G2 Esports | 3 | – | 1 | T1 | Daejeon, South Korea |
| | 17:00 (UTC+9) | | | | | | Daejeon Convention Center II |
| | | K/D/A: 26/21/60; Gold: 92.2K; Turrets: 9 Drakes: 3 Elder Dragons: 0 Barons: 1 Rift Heralds: 0 Voidgrubs: 3 | Game 1; 45:54; G2 leads series 1–0 | | | K/D/A: 21/26/40; Gold: 85.6K; Turrets: 6 Drakes: 3 Elder Dragons: 0 Barons: 2 Rift Heralds: 1 Voidgrubs: 0 | |
| | | K/D/A: 18/8/41; Gold: 66.2K; Turrets: 8 Drakes: 1 Elder Dragons: 0 Barons: 2 Rift Heralds: 1 Voidgrubs: 2 | Game 2; 31:23; G2 leads series 2–0 | | | K/D/A: 8/18/9; Gold: 56.1K; Turrets: 5 Drakes: 3 Elder Dragons: 0 Barons: 0 Rift Heralds: 0 Voidgrubs: 1 | |
| | | K/D/A: 18/27/39; Gold: 57.9K; Turrets: 4 Drakes: 1 Elder Dragons: 0 Barons: 0 Rift Heralds: 1 Voidgrubs: 3 | Game 3; 30:14; G2 leads series 2–1 | | | K/D/A: 27/18/67; Gold: 64.7K; Turrets: 7 Drakes: 3 Elder Dragons: 0 Barons: 1 Rift Heralds: 0 Voidgrubs: 0 | |
| | | K/D/A: 27/34/58; Gold: 102.3K; Turrets: 11; Drakes: 4 Elder Dragons: 0 Barons: 3 Rift Heralds: 0 Voidgrubs: 0 | Game 4; 50:57; G2 wins series 3–1 | | | K/D/A: 34/27/57; Gold: 100.7K; Turrets: 4 Drakes: 3 Elder Dragons: 1 Barons: 0 Rift Heralds: 1 Voidgrubs: 3 | |

| Upper Final; Match 17 | July 9 | Hanwha Life Esports | 1 | – | 3 | Bilibili Gaming | Daejeon, South Korea |
| | 17:00 (UTC+9) | | | | | | Daejeon Convention Center II |
| | | K/D/A: 2/25/6; Gold: 41.0K; Turrets: 1 Drakes: 0 Elder Dragons: 0 Barons: 0 Rift Heralds: 0 Voidgrubs: 0 | Game 1; 25:00; BLG leads series 1–0 | | | K/D/A: 25/2/43; Gold: 57.0K; Turrets: 10; Drakes: 4 Elder Dragons: 0 Barons: 1 Rift Heralds: 1 Voidgrubs: 3 | |
| | | K/D/A: 6/24/15; Gold: 48.3K; Turrets: 0 Drakes: 0 Elder Dragons: 0 Barons: 0 Rift Heralds: 0 Voidgrubs: 3 | Game 2; 29:24; BLG leads series 2–0 | | | K/D/A: 24/6/55; Gold: 64.5K; Turrets: 10; Drakes: 4 Elder Dragons: 0 Barons: 1 Rift Heralds: 1 Voidgrubs: 0 | |
| | | K/D/A: 13/6/28; Gold: 64.0K; Turrets: 10; Drakes: 4 Elder Dragons: 0 Barons: 1 Rift Heralds: 1 Voidgrubs: 3 | Game 3; 31:22; BLG leads series 2–1 | | | K/D/A: 6/13/11; Gold: 53.1K; Turrets: 0 Drakes: 1 Elder Dragons: 0 Barons: 0 Rift Heralds: 0 Voidgrubs: 0 | |
| | | K/D/A: 11/23/25; Gold: 68.4K; Turrets: 3 Drakes: 2 Elder Dragons: 0 Barons: 0 Rift Heralds: 0 Voidgrubs: 2 | Game 4; 37:40; BLG wins series 3–1 | | | K/D/A: 23/11/62; Gold: 76.7K; Turrets: 9 Drakes: 3 Elder Dragons: 0 Barons: 2 Rift Heralds: 1 Voidgrubs: 1 | |

| Lower Round 3 Match 18 | July 10 | LYON | 3 | – | 0 | G2 Esports | Daejeon, South Korea |
| | 17:00 (UTC+9) | | | | | | Daejeon Convention Center II |
| | | K/D/A: 17/8/42; Gold: 69.4K; Turrets: 10; Drakes: 4 Elder Dragons: 0 Barons: 1 Rift Heralds: 0 Voidgrubs: 0 | Game 1; 35:41; LYON leads series 1–0 | | | K/D/A: 8/17/17; Gold: 62.5K; Turrets: 3 Drakes: 1 Elder Dragons: 0 Barons: 0 Rift Heralds: 1 Voidgrubs: 3 | |
| | | K/D/A: 18/7/40; Gold: 61.2K; Turrets: 7 Drakes: 1 Elder Dragons: 0 Barons: 0 Rift Heralds: 1 Voidgrubs: 3 | Game 2; 30:38; LYON leads series 2–0 | | | K/D/A: 6/18/12; Gold: 52.1K; Turrets: 1 Drakes: 3 Elder Dragons: 0 Barons: 0 Rift Heralds: 0 Voidgrubs: 0 | |
| | | K/D/A: 23/5/51; Gold: 76.5K; Turrets: 11; Drakes: 4 Elder Dragons: 0 Barons: 1 Rift Heralds: 1 Voidgrubs: 0 | Game 3; 38:47; LYON wins series 3–0 | | | K/D/A: 5/23/11; Gold: 67.8K; Turrets: 2 Drakes: 1 Elder Dragons: 0 Barons: 1 Rift Heralds: 0 Voidgrubs: 3 | |

| Lower Final; Match 19 | July 11 | Hanwha Life Esports | 3 | – | 2 | LYON | Daejeon, South Korea |
| | 17:00 (UTC+9) | | | | | | Daejeon Convention Center II |
| | | K/D/A: 26/16/59; Gold: 82.1K; Turrets: 10; Drakes: 4 Elder Dragons: 0 Barons: 1 Rift Heralds: 0 Voidgrubs: 1 | Game 1; 38:58; HLE leads series 1–0 | | | K/D/A: 16/26/31; Gold: 73.9K; Turrets: 2 Drakes: 1 Elder Dragons: 1 Barons: 0 Rift Heralds: 1 Voidgrubs: 2 | |
| | | K/D/A: 8/21/22; Gold: 54.5K; Turrets: 3 Drakes: 1 Elder Dragons: 0 Barons: 0 Rift Heralds: 0 Voidgrubs: 1 | Game 2; 30:54; Series tied 1–1 | | | K/D/A: 21/8/53; Gold: 63.0K; Turrets: 7 Drakes: 4 Elder Dragons: 0 Barons: 1 Rift Heralds: 1 Voidgrubs: 2 | |
| | | K/D/A: 17/21/32; Gold: 58.6K; Turrets: 3 Drakes: 3 Elder Dragons: 0 Barons: 0 Rift Heralds: 1 Voidgrubs: 2 | Game 3; 30:28; LYON leads series 2–1 | | | K/D/A: 21/17/55; Gold: 62.4K; Turrets: 8 Drakes: 1 Elder Dragons: 0 Barons: 1 Rift Heralds: 0 Voidgrubs: 1 | |
| | | K/D/A: 20/10/44; Gold: 62.8K; Turrets: 9 Drakes: 4 Elder Dragons: 0 Barons: 1 Rift Heralds: 0 Voidgrubs: 0 | Game 4; 29:49; Series tied 2–2 | | | K/D/A: 10/20/16; Gold: 56.3K; Turrets: 5 Drakes: 0 Elder Dragons: 0 Barons: 0 Rift Heralds: 1 Voidgrubs: 3 | |
| | | K/D/A: 22/4/52; Gold: 52.7K; Turrets: 9 Drakes: 2 Elder Dragons: 0 Barons: 1 Rift Heralds: 1 Voidgrubs: 3 | Game 5; 22:16; HLE wins series 3–2 | | | K/D/A: 4/22/10; Gold: 36.6K; Turrets: 2 Drakes: 0 Elder Dragons: 0 Barons: 0 Rift Heralds: 0 Voidgrubs: 0 | |

| Grand Final; Match 20 | July 12 | Bilibili Gaming | 2 | – | 3 | Hanwha Life Esports | Daejeon, South Korea |
| | 15:00 (UTC+9) | | | | | | Daejeon Convention Center II |
| | | K/D/A: 16/25/45; Gold: 80.5K; Turrets: 4 Drakes: 3 Elder Dragons: 0 Barons: 1 Rift Heralds: 0 Voidgrubs: 0 | Game 1; 43:09; HLE leads series 1–0 | | | K/D/A: 25/16/66; Gold: 87.7K; Turrets: 11; Drakes: 4 Elder Dragons: 0 Barons: 2 Rift Heralds: 1 Voidgrubs: 2 | |
| | | K/D/A: 28/15/58; Gold: 65.3K; Turrets: 6 Drakes: 4 Elder Dragons: 1 Barons: 1 Rift Heralds: 0 Voidgrubs: 2 | Game 2; 32:10; Series tied 1–1 | | | K/D/A: 15/28/33; Gold: 59.2K; Turrets: 3 Drakes: 0 Elder Dragons: 0 Barons: 0 Rift Heralds: 1 Voidgrubs: 1 | |
| | | K/D/A: 20/7/43; Gold: 66.8K; Turrets: 10; Drakes: 4 Elder Dragons: 0 Barons: 1 Rift Heralds: 1 Voidgrubs: 3 | Game 3; 32:18; BLG leads series 2–1 | | | K/D/A: 7/20/17; Gold: 54.8K; Turrets: 2 Drakes: 1 Elder Dragons: 0 Barons: 0 Rift Heralds: 0 Voidgrubs: 0 | |
| | | K/D/A: 13/28/29; Gold: 56.5K; Turrets: 2 Drakes: 0 Elder Dragons: 0 Barons: 0 Rift Heralds: 1 Voidgrubs: 0 | Game 4; 31:08; Series tied 2–2 | | | K/D/A: 28/13/64; Gold: 67.8K; Turrets: 10; Drakes: 4 Elder Dragons: 0 Barons: 1 Rift Heralds: 0 Voidgrubs: 3 | |
| | | K/D/A: 20/21/47; Gold: 69.5K; Turrets: 4 Drakes: 2 Elder Dragons: 0 Barons: 0 Rift Heralds: 1 Voidgrubs: 0 | Game 5; 36:25; HLE wins series 3–2 | | | K/D/A: 21/20/53; Gold: 73.0K; Turrets: 8 Drakes: 3 Elder Dragons: 0 Barons: 2 Rift Heralds: 0 Voidgrubs: 3 | |

== Ranking ==
A base prize pool of US$2,000,000 is offered for the tournament. The prize pool is spread among the teams as seen below:

| Place | League | Team | Prize (%) | Prize (USD) |
|---|---|---|---|---|
| 1st | LCK | Hanwha Life Esports | 25% | $500,000 |
| 2nd | LPL | Bilibili Gaming | 15% | $300,000 |
| 3rd | LCS | LYON | 12% | $240,000 |
| 4th | LEC | G2 Esports | 10% | $200,000 |
| 5th–6th | LCK | T1 | 8% | $160,000 |
| 5th–6th | LCP | Team Secret Whales | 8% | $160,000 |
| 7th–8th | CBLOL | FURIA | 5.5% | $110,000 |
| 7th–8th | LPL | Top Esports | 5.5% | $110,000 |
| 9th | LCS | Team Liquid Alienware | 4.5% | $90,000 |
| 10th | LEC | Karmine Corp | 3.5% | $70,000 |
| 11th | LCP | Relove Deep Cross Gaming | 3% | $60,000 |

== Global partners ==
- Amazon Web Services
- Esports World Cup
- Esports Nations Cup
- Cisco
- Coinbase
- HyperX
- Mastercard
- HP Omen
- Opera GX
- Oppo
- Red Bull
- Secretlab
- Verizon
