= 2025 LCP season =

- League: LCP
- Sport: League of Legends
- Duration: 17 January – 23 February (Season Kickoff); 19 April – 8 June (Mid-Season); 26 July – 21 September (Season Finals)
- Teams: 8

Season Kickoff
- Champions: CTBC Flying Oyster
- Runners-up: Talon
- Season MVP: Yu "JunJia" Chun-chia (CTBC Flying Oyster)

Mid-Season
- Champions: CTBC Flying Oyster
- Runners-up: GAM Esports
- Season MVP: Shen "Driver" Tsung-hua (CTBC Flying Oyster)

Season Finals
- Season Champions: CTBC Flying Oyster
- Runners-up: Team Secret Whales
- Season MVP: Tsai "HongQ" Ming-hong (CTBC Flying Oyster)

LCP seasons
- 2026 →

The 2025 LCP season was the inaugural season of the League of Legends Championship Pacific (LCP), an Asia-Pacific esports league for the video game League of Legends by developer Riot Games and tournament organizer Carry International. The league launched with eight teams — four partner teams and four guest teams, all playing across three splits in line with the new three-split structure and competitive calendar introduced the game's developer Riot Games starting with the 2025 competitive season. The season began on 17 January and ended on 21 September.

CTBC Flying Oyster won all three splits of the season, defeating a different opponent in each split (Season Kickoff vs. Talon, later PSG Talon, Mid-Season vs. GAM Esports, & Season Finals vs. Team Secret Whales). Through this feat, the team qualified for all three international tournaments (2025 First Stand Tournament, 2025 Mid-Season Invitational, 2025 League of Legends World Championship, being the only team to do so across all five Tier 1 regions.

Aside from CTBC Flying Oyster, GAM Esports qualified for MSI 2025, while Team Secret Whales and PSG Talon qualified for the 2025 World Championship as the second and third seeds respectively.

== Notable events ==
Riot Games announced on 11 June 2024 that a new eight-team Asia-Pacific league would be formed to become the new Tier 1 league in the region, which would also have a hybrid promotion and relegation system, with some teams being the league's franchise partners while others were guest teams that would be relegated. As a result, the Pacific Championship Series (PCS), Vietnam Championship Series (VCS), and the League of Legends Japan League (LJL) would become Tier 2 leagues and would serve as pathways to qualify for the new league, which would be later known as the League of Legends Championship Pacific on 29 September 2024, with the inaugural season's participating teams and format being announced in early November. Days before the start of the season, Riot Games announced that the LCP would be played on the live patch, making it the first professional league in Asia to do so, and the third after the now-reinstated League Championship Series (initially the League of Legends Championship of The Americas North Conference) and the League of Legends EMEA Championship.

Other notable events

- On 16 March 2025, Riot Games announced that the "Fearless Draft" format, which was used during the LCP's Season Kickoff and the First Stand Tournament, would be used for the rest of 2025, including the LCP and international events.
- On 15 July 2025, PSG Esports resumed their partnership with Talon Esports, rebranding their League division back to PSG Talon after 6 months.

== Guest teams ==
Four guest teams are competing in the 2025 season – Team Secret Whales and MGN Vikings Esports from Vietnam, DetonatioN FocusMe from Japan, and Chiefs Esports Club from Australia. The two bottom-ranked teams at the conclusion of Season Finals will compete in promotion and relegation tournament against the top teams from the Tier 2 leagues (currently consisting of the PCS, VCS, LJL and a "Wild Card" spot) based on their location.

== Season Kickoff ==
=== Format ===
All eight (8) competing teams played in a single round-robin during the Regular Season, with all matches being contested in best-of-threes. The top six (6) teams progressed to the Double-elimination tournament Qualifying Series, which included a series of best-of-three and best-of-five matches, with the winner qualifying for the 2025 First Stand Tournament as the LCP's lone representative.

The Season Kickoff implemented the "Fearless Draft" format, which was popularized by China's LoL Development League, where teams cannot pick a champion that they've already played in a series, even if the champion was picked by the opposing team. As mentioned above, it was also used during Mid-Season and will be used during Season Finals.

=== Regular season ===
Pos	Team	Pld	W	L	PCT	Qualification
1	Talon	7	6	1	.857	Advance to playoffs
2	CTBC Flying Oyster	7	6	1	.857	Advance to playoffs
3	MGN Vikings Esports	7	5	2	.714	Advance to playoffs
4	Team Secret Whales	7	5	2	.714	Advance to playoffs
5	GAM Esports	7	3	4	.429	Advance to playoffs
6	SoftBank Hawks	7	2	5	.286	Advance to playoffs
7	DetonatioN FocusMe	7	1	6	.143	
8	Chiefs Esports Club	7	0	7	.000	

Updated to match(es) played on 14 February 2025. Source: LoL Esports

=== Qualifying Series ===
As the highest-ranked team in Round 1, MGN Vikings Esports had the chance to select their opponents. Talon also earned the right to select their opponents in Round 2 being the top seed.

==== Bracket ====
Upper quarterfinals
18 February
3	MGN Vikings Esports	2
6	SoftBank Hawks	0
18 February
4	Team Secret Whales	0
5	GAM Esports	2

Upper semifinals
19 February
1	Talon	1
3	MGN Vikings Esports	2
19 February
2	CTBC Flying Oyster	2
5	GAM Esports	0
Lower semifinals
21 February
1	Talon	2
5	GAM Esports	1

Upper final
21 February
3	MGN Vikings Esports	1
2	CTBC Flying Oyster	3
Lower final
22 February
3	MGN Vikings Esports	2
1	Talon	3

Final
23 February
2	CTBC Flying Oyster	3
1	Talon	1

Source: LoL Esports

=== Awards ===
Award	Player	Team
Finals MVP	HongQ	CTBC Flying Oyster
Season MVP	JunJia	CTBC Flying Oyster
Rookie of the Split	HongQ	CTBC Flying Oyster
Team of the Split
Team of the Split	Kratos	MGN Vikings Esports
Team of the Split	JunJia	CTBC Flying Oyster
Team of the Split	HongQ	CTBC Flying Oyster
Team of the Split	Betty	Talon
Team of the Split	SiuLoong	MGN Vikings Esports

== Mid-season ==
=== Format ===
In the Mid-Season split, the eight (8) competing teams competed in a single-round robin, with all matches being played in best-of-threes. The top six (6) teams advanced to the Qualifying Series, where the first two rounds were contested in best-of-threes, and the last two rounds in best-of-fives. Teams that finished in the top two (2) received a bye to the second round, while the remaining four (4) teams began in Round 1.

The Qualifying Series was played in a semi-double elimination bracket, with the two finalists securing their spot at the 2025 Mid-Season Invitational. Side selection during the first game of each series was decided by a one-on-one solo match.

=== Regular season ===
Pos	Team	Pld	W	L	PCT	Qualification
1	CTBC Flying Oyster	7	7	0	1.000	Qualifying Series; Round 2
2	Team Secret Whales	7	5	2	.714	Qualifying Series; Round 2
3	Talon	7	5	2	.714	Qualifying Series; Round 1
4	GAM Esports	7	4	3	.571	Qualifying Series; Round 1
5	MGN Vikings Esports	7	4	3	.571	Qualifying Series; Round 1
6	SoftBank Hawks	7	2	5	.286	Qualifying Series; Round 1
7	DetonatioN FocusMe	7	1	6	.143	
8	Chiefs Esports Club	7	0	7	.000	

Updated to match(es) played on 25 May 2025. Source: LoL Esports

==== Tiebreaker ====
In case teams have similar records, game record was determined as a tiebreaker. Secret Wales had a 12–5 win-loss game slate, while Talon only had 11–7; hence, TSW's spot in second place. The same is applied with GAM Esports, who have a 10–7 game record, and MGN Vikings Esports, who only have a 9–8 game slate; thus putting GAM at the fourth position.

=== Qualifying Series ===
As the highest-ranked team in Round 1, Talon had the chance to select their opponents. CTBC Flying Oyster, being the top-ranked team in Round 2, also chose their opponents.

==== Bracket ====
Upper quarterfinals
30 May
3	Talon	2
6	SoftBank Hawks	0
30 May
4	GAM Esports	2
5	MGN Vikings Esports	1

Upper semifinals
31 May
1	CTBC Flying Oyster	2
4	GAM Esports	1
31 May
2	Team Secret Whales	0
3	Talon	2
Lower semifinals
6 June
4	GAM Esports	3
2	Team Secret Whales	1

Upper final
1 June
1	CTBC Flying Oyster	3
3	Talon	2
Lower final
7 June
3	Talon	1
4	GAM Esports	3

Final
8 June
1	CTBC Flying Oyster	3
4	GAM Esports	2

Source: LoL Esports

=== Awards ===
Award	Player	Team
Finals MVP	Kaiwing	CTBC Flying Oyster
Season MVP	Driver	CTBC Flying Oyster
Team of the Split
Team of the Split	Kiaya	GAM Esports
Team of the Split	Levi	GAM Esports
Team of the Split	HongQ	CTBC Flying Oyster
Team of the Split	Doggo	CTBC Flying Oyster
Team of the Split	Kaiwing	CTBC Flying Oyster

== Season Finals ==
=== Format ===
Based on their standings from the Mid-Season split, all eight (8) competing teams were divided into two groups of four teams — Contender (top four teams) and Breakout (bottom four teams). There were two phases of the regular season, with the first phase being a single round-robin tournament, where all matches were played in best-of-threes to determine standings for the next phase. The second phase sees a group reshuffle via a group breaker, where the 4th-placed contender team and the 1st-placed breakout team, as well as the 3rd-placed contender team and the 2nd-placed breakout team, will go head-to-head. Winning teams joined the contender group, while losing teams proceeded to the breakout group.

Teams in each group then competed in a GSL-style double-elimination bracket, with all Contender Group teams advancing to the playoffs, and only Breakout Group teams that achieve two wins advancing. Teams in the contender group played only for seeding. In the playoffs, a double-elimination playoff bracket was applied, with the six (6) remaining teams playing a mix of best-of-threes and best-of-fives. The winner of the Final was crowned the LCP Champion, with the top three (3) teams earning qualification to the 2025 League of Legends World Championship.

On 26 May 2025, the LCP announced that the Finals Weekend of Season Finals will be held in Da Nang, Vietnam from 20–21 September at the Tien Son Sport Center.

=== Regular season ===
Contender Group

Pos	Team	Pld	W	L	PCT	Qualification
1	CTBC Flying Oyster	3	3	0	1.000	Phase 2 Contender Group
2	Team Secret Whales	3	2	1	.667	Phase 2 Contender Group
3	GAM Esports	3	1	2	.333	Group Breaker
4	PSG Talon	3	0	3	.000	Group Breaker

Updated to match(es) played on 10 August 2025. Source: LoL Esports

Breakout Group

Pos	Team	Pld	W	L	PCT	Qualification
1	MGN Vikings Esports	3	3	0	1.000	Group Breaker
2	SoftBank Hawks	3	2	1	.667	Group Breaker
3	DetonatioN FocusMe	3	1	2	.333	Phase 2 Breakout Group
4	Chiefs Esports Club	3	0	3	.000	Phase 2 Breakout Group

Updated to match(es) played on 10 August 2025. Source: LoL Esports

=== Group Breaker ===
Group Breaker 1; 15 August
GAM Esports	2
SoftBank Hawks	0

Group Breaker 2; 15 August
PSG Talon	0
MGN Vikings Esports	2

=== Phase 2 ===
Contender Group

Round 1
16 August
CTBC Flying Oyster	2
MGN Vikings Esports	1
16 August
Team Secret Whales	0
GAM Esports	2
3rd/4th Seed Playoff
23 August
MGN Vikings Esports	1
Team Secret Whales	2

1st Seed Playoff
22 August
CTBC Flying Oyster	2
GAM Esports	0
2nd Seed Playoff
24 August
GAM Esports	2
Team Secret Whales	0

Top Two Seeds
CTBC Flying Oyster
GAM Esports

Breakout Group

Round 1
17 August
PSG Talon	2
Chiefs Esports Club	0
17 August
SoftBank Hawks	1
DetonatioN FocusMe	2
Elimination Match
23 August
Chiefs Esports Club	1
SoftBank Hawks	2

5th Seed Playoff
22 August
PSG Talon	2
DetonatioN FocusMe	0
6th Seed Playoff
24 August
DetonatioN FocusMe	2
SoftBank Hawks	0

Playoffs Qualified
PSG Talon
DetonatioN FocusMe

=== Playoffs ===
Venues:

- LCP Arena, Taipei, Taiwan
- Tien Son Sport Center, Da Nang, Vietnam (Lower Bracket Final and Finals)

Upper round 1	Upper round 2	Upper final	Final
6 September – Taipei
5 September – Taipei	1	CTBC Flying Oyster	2
3	Team Secret Whales	2	3	Team Secret Whales	1	13 September – Taipei
6	DetonatioN FocusMe	0	1	CTBC Flying Oyster	3
6 September – Taipei	5	PSG Talon	1
5 September – Taipei	2	GAM Esports	0
4	MGN Vikings Esports	0	5	PSG Talon	2
21 September – Da Nang
5	PSG Talon	2
1	CTBC Flying Oyster	3
3	Team Secret Whales	0
Lower round 1	Lower round 2	Lower round 3	Lower final
20 September – Da Nang
14 September – Taipei	5	PSG Talon	1
12 September – Taipei	2	GAM Esports	0	3	Team Secret Whales	3
7 September – Taipei	3	Team Secret Whales	3	3	Team Secret Whales	3
6	DetonatioN FocusMe	1	4	MGN Vikings Esports	1
4	MGN Vikings Esports	3

=== Awards ===
Award	Player	Team
Finals MVP	HongQ	CTBC Flying Oyster
Season MVP	HongQ	CTBC Flying Oyster
Team of the Split
Team of the Split	Rest	CTBC Flying Oyster
Team of the Split	JunJia	CTBC Flying Oyster
Team of the Split	HongQ	CTBC Flying Oyster
Team of the Split	Doggo	CTBC Flying Oyster
Team of the Split	Taki	Team Secret Whales

== Promotion and relegation ==
The promotion and relegation phase is a series of matches deciding promotion and relegation for teams into the 2026 LCP season. A total of seven teams will take part in the Promotion Tournament – one each from the Pacific Championship Series (PCS), Vietnam Championship Series (VCS), and the League of Legends Japan League (LJL), the winners of both the LCP Oceanic Promotion Qualifier and the LCP Wild Card Playoffs, and two guest teams from the 2025 LCP season depending on their performance in Season Finals.

For the LCP Wild Card Playoffs, five teams qualified through winning their respective tournaments that served as qualifiers for the event – one each from the League of Legends Nusantara Cup (Indonesia), League of Legends Titans Cup (Malaysia and Singapore), Liga Republika (Philippines), Legends Ascend South Asia (South Asia), and the League of Legends Thailand Series (Thailand).

=== Qualified teams ===
If a domestic team that would be in the Promotion Tournament is an academy team of a current LCP team, they cannot participate. The spot then goes to the highest-ranked non-academy team from that league.

Promotion Tournament

League/Tournament	Team	Path
League of Legends Championship Pacific	Chiefs Esports Club	Guest teams
League of Legends Championship Pacific	MGN Vikings Esports	Guest teams
League of Legends Japan League	QT DIG∞	Season Champion
Pacific Championship Series	Deep Cross Gaming	Split 3 winner
Vietnam Championship Series	Saigon Dino	Season Champion
LCP Oceanic Promotion Qualifier	Saving OCE	Winner
LCP Wild Card Playoffs	Inferno Esports	Winner

LCP Wild Card Playoffs

Bold – indicates team that won the tournament.

Region	Tournament	Team
Indonesia	League of Legends Nusantara Cup	Yang Dae Pal
Malaysia/Singapore	League of Legends Titans Cup	Faerie Charm
Philippines	Liga Republika	**Inferno Esports**
South Asia	Legends Ascend South Asia	S8UL Esports
Thailand	League of Legends Thailand Series	FULL SENSE

=== Format ===
LCP Wild Card Playoffs

The five teams competed in a single round-robin group stage in best-of-two series, with rankings being determined by a points system. Three teams will advanced to the playoffs; the top-ranked team received a bye and advance to the finals, with the second and third-ranked teams competing in the semifinals. The winner of the finals qualified for the LCP Promotion Tournament. All playoff matches were best-of-five series in a single-elimination bracket, and side selection was decided in a one-on-one match.

Promotion Tournament

The seven teams will contest two guest spots, with each spot being determined differently. One slot is determined through the Free-For-All bracket, where five teams will compete in a single-elimination bracket, with all matches being contested in best-of-fives. Another slot is contested through the Regional Merit match, where two teams will compete in a single best-of-five series. The winner of the Free-For-All bracket and the winner of the Regional Merit match will qualify as guest teams for the 2026 LCP season.

Teams that contested in the Free-For-All bracket cannot contest in Regional Merit.

=== LCP Wild Card Playoffs ===
==== Group stage ====
Pos	Team	Pld	W	D	L	Pts	Qualification	IE	FS	FRC	YDP	S8UL
1	Inferno Esports	4	3	1	0	**7**	Finals	—	1–1	2–0	2–0	2–0
2	FULL SENSE	4	2	2	0	**6**	Semifinals	1–1	—	1–1	2–0	2–0
3	Faerie Charm	4	1	2	1	**4**	Semifinals	0–2	1–1	—	1–1	2–0
4	Yang Dae Pal	4	0	2	2	**2**	Eliminated	0–2	0–2	1–1	—	1–1
5	S8UL Esports	4	0	1	3	**1**	Eliminated	0–2	0–2	0–2	1–1	—

Updated to match(es) played on 28 August 2025. Source:

==== Playoffs ====
Semifinals
30 August
**2**	**FULL SENSE**	**3**
3	Faerie Charm	0

Finals
31 August
**1**	**Inferno Esports**	**3**
SF	FULL SENSE	2

=== Promotion Tournament ===
A draw for both the free-for-all bracket and regional merit match was conducted on 21 September 2025 before the LCP Season Finals. All matches will be held at the LCP Arena in Taipei, Taiwan.

Regional Merit

Qualification Match
4 October
**MGN Vikings Esports**	**3**
Saigon Dino	1

Free-For-All Bracket

Round 1
1 October
QT DIG∞	0
**Deep Cross Gaming**	**3**
1 October
**Inferno Esports**	**3**
Saving OCE	1

Round 2
2 October
**Deep Cross Gaming**	**3**
Inferno Esports	0

Qualification Match
3 October
Chiefs Esports Club	1
**Deep Cross Gaming**	**3**
