= AXZ =

AXZ may refer to:

- AXIZ, a team in the League of Legends Japan League
- 3.2 VR6 24v FSI (EA390), a model of engine manufactured by Volkswagen Group; see List of Volkswagen Group petrol engines

== See also ==
- Symphogear AXZ (2017), the fourth season of the anime franchise Symphogear
