= 2021 Los Angeles Valiant season =

- Head coach: Zhang "JpCat" Peng
- Owner: Noah Whinston
- Region: East

Results
- Record: 0–16 (.000)
- Place: East: 8th; League: 20th
- May Melee: Did not qualify
- June Joust: Did not qualify
- Summer Showdown: Did not qualify
- Countdown Cup: Did not qualify
- Season Playoffs: Did not qualify
- Total Earnings: $0

The 2021 Los Angeles Valiant season was the fourth season of Los Angeles Valiant's existence in the Overwatch League.

== Preceding offseason ==
=== Roster changes ===
The Valiant entered free agency with three free agents, two of which became free agents due to the Valiant not exercising the option to retain the player for another year.

==== Acquisitions ====
The Valiant's first acquisition of the offseason was Adam "Adam" Soong, a rookie tank player coming from Overwatch Contenders Australia team Ground Zero Gaming who signed on November 19, 2020. On December 9, they signed Brady "Agilities" Girardi, a veteran damage player who had played for the Valiant in 2018 and 2019 before signing with the Toronto Defiant in 2020.

After releasing the entirety of their roster and staff in preparation for their move to China for the 2021 season, the Valiant announced their new roster on March 18, 2021. For their damage players, they signed Liao "Molanran" Yang, a "highly touted prospect" from Contenders, and Cai "Krystal" Shilong, a controversial player who had been forcibly removed from his prior two Overwatch League teams. Their tank signings consisted of Han "Sliver3" Haibo, Wen "NvM" Yelin, who had been retired for over three years, and Cheng "ShowCheng" Yu. For their support players, the Valiant signed Zhang "Highbee" Zening and Qi "Wya" Haomiao, another "highly touted prospect" at points in his career.

==== Departures ====
None of the Spark's three free agents returned, two of which signed with other teams, beginning with damage player Damon "Apply" Conti, who signed with Overwatch Contenders team Revival on December 9, 2020. On February 1, 2021, tank player Rick "Gig" Salazar signed with Contenders team We Want OWL. The team's final free agent damage player Caleb "McGravy" McGarvey announced his retirement in the offseason.

Outside of free agency, the Valiant's first departure was damage player Kyle "KSF" Frandanisa, who was transferred to the Houston Outlaws on December 7. On February 2, 2021, the Valiant released all of its players and staff, citing visa issues, as they prepared compete from China instead of North America for the 2021 season. Players released included damage players Brady "Agilities" Girardi, Kai "Kai" Collins, and Johannes "Shax" Nielsen; tank players Adam "Adam" Soong and Song "Dreamer" Sang-lok; and support players Mun "Lastro" Jung-won and Park "Rain" Jae-ho.

== Regular season ==
=== May Melee ===
The Valiant began their 2021 season on April 17 with a loss to the Chengdu Hunters 1–3 in the May Melee qualifiers. They were swept in their following match against the Philadelphia Fusion 0–3.

== Final roster ==
2021 Los Angeles Valiant roster
Players
Coaches

Role	No.	Handle	Name	Nationality
Damage	1	Molanran	Liao Yang	China
Damage	7	Krystal	Cai Shilong	China
Tank	3	Silver3	Han Haibo	China
Tank	20	NvM	Wen Yelin	China
Tank	18	ShowCheng	Cheng Yu	China
Support	22	Highbee	Zhang Zening	China
Support	11	Wya	Qi Haomiao	China

Head coach

- Zhang "JpCat" Peng

Legend:
- (I) Inactive
- (S) Suspended
- (2W) Two-way player
- Substitute
- (injured) Injury / Illness

Latest roster transaction: 18 March 2021.

== Standings ==
Pos	Team	Pld	W	L	Pts	PCT	MW	ML	MT	MD	Qualification
1	Shanghai Dragons	16	12	4	20	0.750	38	19	2	+19	Advance to season playoffs
2	Chengdu Hunters	16	11	5	15	0.688	38	22	2	+16	Advance to season playoffs
3	Seoul Dynasty	16	12	4	12	0.750	40	22	0	+18	Advance to play-ins
4	Philadelphia Fusion	16	10	6	10	0.625	37	24	3	+13	Advance to play-ins
5	Hangzhou Spark	16	7	9	7	0.438	32	31	0	+1	Advance to play-ins
6	New York Excelsior	16	7	9	7	0.438	29	32	0	−3	
7	Guangzhou Charge	16	5	11	5	0.313	20	38	4	−18	
8	Los Angeles Valiant	16	0	16	0	0.000	2	48	1	−46	

Source: The Overwatch League
Rules for classification: 1) points; 2) winning percentage (including tournaments); 3) regular season wins; 4) regular season map differential

== Game log ==
=== Regular season ===
2021 game log
May Melee

Qualifier match 1	April 17	Los Angeles Valiant	1	–	3	Chengdu Hunters	Online
	3:30 am PDT	Details					
		0	Lijiang Tower			2	
		3	King's Row			2	
		0	Havana			3	
		1	Volskaya Industries			2	

Qualifier match 2	April 18	Philadelphia Fusion	3	–	0	Los Angeles Valiant	Online
	5:00 am PDT	Details					
		2	Busan			1	
		3	Eichenwalde			2	
		3	Watchpoint: Gibraltar			2	

Qualifier match 3	April 30	Los Angeles Valiant	0	–	3	Guangzhou Charge	Online
	2:00 am PDT	Details					
		1	Ilios			2	
		0	Hanamura			1	
		1	Eichenwalde			2	

Qualifier match 4	May 01	Seoul Dynasty	3	–	0	Los Angeles Valiant	Online
	2:00 am PDT	Details					
		2	Nepal			0	
		2	Temple of Anubis			1	
		3	Blizzard World			1	

June Joust

Qualifier match 1	May 29	Shanghai Dragons	3	–	0	Los Angeles Valiant	Online
	2:00 am PDT	Details					
		2	Busan			0	
		3	Rialto			1	
		1	Volskaya Industries			1	
		1	Numbani			0	

Qualifier match 2	May 30	New York Excelsior	3	–	0	Los Angeles Valiant	Online
	2:00 am PDT	Details					
		2	Ilios			0	
		1	Dorado			0	
		1	Temple of Anubis			0	

Qualifier match 3	June 04	Los Angeles Valiant	0	–	3	Hangzhou Spark	Hangzhou, CN
	5:00 am PDT	Details					Future Sci-Tech City
		0	Oasis			2	
		0	Hanamura			2	
		1	Hollywood			2	

Qualifier match 4	June 05	Los Angeles Valiant	1	–	3	Philadelphia Fusion	Hangzhou, CN
	2:00 am PDT	Details					Future Sci-Tech City
		0	Nepal			2	
		1	Volskaya Industries			2	
		1	Numbani			0	
		1	Rialto			2	

Summer Showdown

Qualifier match 1	June 26	Hangzhou Spark	3	–	0	Los Angeles Valiant	Online
	2:00 am PDT	Details					
		2	Lijiang Tower			1	
		2	Eichenwalde			1	
		1	Route 66			0	

Qualifier match 2	June 27	New York Excelsior	3	–	0	Los Angeles Valiant	Online
	5:00 am PDT	Details					
		2	Ilios			0	
		3	Hollywood			0	
		3	Watchpoint: Gibraltar			1	

Qualifier match 3	July 09	Los Angeles Valiant	0	–	3	Shanghai Dragons	Shanghai, CN
	5:00 am PDT	Details					Jing'An Sports Center
		1	Nepal			2	
		0	Volskaya Industries			1	
		2	King's Row			3	

Qualifier match 4	July 10	Los Angeles Valiant	0	–	3	Chengdu Hunters	Shanghai, CN
	3:30 am PDT	Details					Jing'An Sports Center
		0	Oasis			2	
		1	Temple of Anubis			2	
		0	Eichenwalde			1	

Countdown Cup

Qualifier match 1	July 31	New York Excelsior	3	–	0	Los Angeles Valiant	Online
	3:30 am PDT	Details					
		2	Oasis			1	
		3	Blizzard World			2	
		3	Rialto			1	

Qualifier match 2	August 01	Seoul Dynasty	3	–	0	Los Angeles Valiant	Online
	2:00 am PDT	Details					
		2	Ilios			0	
		1	Numbani			0	
		3	Havana			2	

Qualifier match 3	August 13	Los Angeles Valiant	0	–	3	Guangzhou Charge	Online
	3:30 am PDT	Details					
		1	Nepal			2	
		1	Hanamura			2	
		1	King's Row			2	

Qualifier match 4	August 14	Los Angeles Valiant	0	–	3	Chengdu Hunters	Online
	3:30 am PDT	Details					
		0	Lijiang Tower			2	
		1	Volskaya Industries			2	
		0	Numbani			3	

2021 season schedule
