= CTBC Flying Oyster =

Taiwanese League of Legends team

- Short name: CFO
- Game: League of Legends
- Founded: 26 January 2022
- League: Pacific Championship Series (PCS): 2022–2024; League of Legends Championship Pacific (LCP): 2025–present
- Based in: Taipei, Taiwan
- Colours: Blue and yellow
- Championships: 3× LCP, 1× PCS
- Main sponsor: CTBC Bank
- Parent group: CTBC Sports Entertainment
- Motto: "We are family"

Chinese name
- Traditional Chinese: 中信飛牡蠣
- Simplified Chinese: 中信飞牡蛎
Transcriptions
Standard Mandarin
- Hanyu Pinyin: Zhōngxìn Fēimǔlì

CTBC Flying Oyster (CFO) is a Taiwanese professional League of Legends team competing in the League of Legends Championship Pacific (LCP), the game's top-level league in the Asia–Pacific. It previously competed in the Pacific Championship Series (PCS) and has four domestic titles, three from the LCP and one from the PCS. The team is owned by CTBC Sports Entertainment, a subsidiary of CTBC Bank.

CFO has made an appearance at all three international tournaments hosted by Riot Games, the developer of League of Legends. The team's best finish was at the 2025 First Stand Tournament, where they placed third to fourth overall after being knocked out in the semifinals.

== History ==
=== Founding ===
CTBC Flying Oyster (CFO) was founded on 26 January 2022 by CTBC Sports Entertainment after it acquired the PCS spot of Machi Esports. The team's inaugural roster consisted of former players of Machi Esports and J Team: top laner Hsu "Rest" Shih-chieh, jungler Huang "Gemini" Chu-hsuan, mid laner Chen "Mission" Hsiao-hsien, bot laner Sung "Atlen" Ya-lun, and support Lin "Koala" Chih-chiang.

=== 2022 season ===
CFO finished third in the spring regular season after defeating fellow newcomers Deep Cross Gaming in a tiebreaker match, qualifying CFO for the first round of playoffs in the winners' bracket. After sweeping sixth-place Meta Falcon Team in the first round and second-place J Team in the second round, CFO took a convincing 3–1 victory over defending champions PSG Talon in the semifinals. This immediately qualified CFO for the spring finals, an achievement made in their inaugural split. However, CFO narrowly lost the PCS title after losing to PSG Talon in the final match of a full best-of-five series.

CFO did not make any changes to their starting roster for the summer split and finished fourth in the regular season after defeating Frank Esports in a tiebreaker match. This placement qualified CFO for the first round of playoffs in the winners' bracket, where they defeated Frank Esports in a best-of-five series. CFO then narrowly defeated first-place PSG Talon in the second round to advance to their second PCS semifinals, where they took a convincing victory over sixth-place Beyond Gaming. This victory qualified CFO for the 2022 World Championship as one of the PCS' two representatives. In the finals, CFO once again faced off against Beyond Gaming, who they swept to claim their first PCS title.

=== 2023 season ===
CFO secured third place in the spring regular season with a 12–7 record. Their spring playoffs journey ended in a 1–3 loss to Frank Esports in the lower bracket semifinals, resulting in a third-place finish. CFO ended the summer regular season in fifth place with a 9–9 record. The team improved their standing in the summer playoffs, fighting through the bracket before losing 2–3 in a finals rematch against PSG Talon. CFO's second runners-up finish earned them a spot in the 2023 World Championship, where they were eliminated in the play-in stage after a 0–2 loss to Team BDS, placing CFO between 19th and 20th overall.

=== 2024 season ===
CFO finished first in the spring regular season with an 8–2 record. However, their spring playoffs run ended after a 0–3 loss to Japanese team SoftBank Hawks in the lower bracket semifinals, placing them third. The team finished third in the summer regular season with a 6–4 record. They ended the summer playoffs with another 1–3 loss to Frank Esports, resulting in a fifth-place finish.

=== 2025 season ===
CFO was selected as a partner team of the League of Legends Championship Pacific (LCP). They finished second in the league's inaugural regular season (LCP season kickoff) with a 6–1 record. They defeated Talon 3–1 in the finals to secure their second domestic title and the first ever LCP title, as well as a spot in the inaugural First Stand Tournament. In the group stage of First Stand, CFO finished second with a 3–1 record, only dropping a game to South Korea's Hanwha Life Esports. CFO was knocked out by Europe's Karmine Corp in the semifinals, placing third to fourth overall.

CFO finished the mid-season regular season undefeated with seven series wins. The team narrowly defeated Vietnam's GAM Esports 3–2 to win their second LCP title and a spot in the main event of the 2025 Mid-Season Invitational (MSI 2025), the first time they qualified for the tournament. In the main event bracket stage of MSI 2025, CFO was knocked out in the second round of the lower bracket by Chinese team Anyone's Legend.

For the third and final split, CFO started their campaign with a flawless 3-0 win/loss record in the Contender group to advance to the group playoffs, where they again had a flawless record. They then dominated the season playoffs, culminating with a 3-0 win over Team Secret Whales in the grand finals to become the season champion and securing qualification to the 2025 League of Legends World Championship. In doing so, CFO are the only team from any of the five major professional leagues (LCK, LPL, LCP, LEC, and LTA) to have qualified for all three major international League of Legends events.

== Team identity ==
The team's name is a bilingual pun. "Flying Oyster" in Mandarin Chinese is feimuli (飛牡蠣), which sounds similar to "family" in English. The team's founders intended for the Chinese name to have the double meaning of "CTBC family", a reference to the company slogan of CTBC Bank – "We are family" – which is also CFO's team motto.

CFO's first logo emphasised the "Flying Oyster" part of its name. It was changed before the 2022 summer split to a design that emphasised the team's abbreviation, CFO. The logo features the team's colours, blue and yellow.

== Roster ==
CTBC Flying Oyster roster
Players
Coaches

Role	Handle	Name	Nationality
Top	Rest	Hsu Shih-chieh	Taiwan
Jungle	Shad0w	Zhao Zhiqiang	Italy
Mid	POUT	Han In-woong	South Korea
Bot	Doggo	Chiu Tzu-chuan	Taiwan
Support	Kino	Wu Hsin-Jung	Taiwan

Head coach

Wong "Chawy" Xing Lei

Assistant coach(es)

Liu "Wulala" Sheng-wei

Legend:
- (I) Inactive
- (S) Suspended
- Substitute
- (injured) Injury / Illness

Roster updated 13 April 2026.

== Season-by-season records ==
Year		Pacific Championship Series (2022–2024) LoL Championship Pacific (2025–present)						First Stand	Mid-Season Invitational	World Championship
Year		P	W	L	W–L	Pos.	Playoffs	First Stand	Mid-Season Invitational	World Championship
2022	Spring	18	13	5	.722	3rd	Runners-up	–	Did not qualify	Group stage
2022	Summer	18	12	6	.667	4th	Champions	–	Did not qualify	Group stage
2023	Spring	18	12	7	.632	3rd	Semifinals (LB)	–	Did not qualify	Group stage
2023	Summer	18	9	9	.500	5th	Runners-up	–	Did not qualify	Group stage
2024	Spring	23	18	5	.783	3rd	Semifinals (LB)	–	Did not qualify	Did not qualify
2024	Summer	22	12	10	.545	3rd	Round 3	–	Did not qualify	Did not qualify
2025	Kickoff	18	13	5	.722	2nd	Champions	Semifinals	Lower round 2	Quarterfinals
2025	Mid	16	14	2	.875	1st	Champions	Semifinals	Lower round 2	Quarterfinals
2025	Finals	11	9	2	.818	1st	Champions	Semifinals	Lower round 2	Quarterfinals
2026	Split 1	17	8	9	.471	5th	Round 1	Did not qualify	Did not qualify	Swiss stage
2026	Split 2	18	7	11	.389	6th	Round 1	Did not qualify	Did not qualify	Swiss stage
2026	Split 3	22	13	9	.591	1st	Runners-up	Did not qualify	Did not qualify	Swiss stage
