= Pentagram (esports) =

Japanese esports organization (2012–2019)

- Short name: PGM
- Former divisions: League of Legends; PlayerUnknown's Battlegrounds
- Founded: September 2012 (as Rampage)
- Folded: 18 April 2019
- League: League of Legends Japan League (LJL)
- Team history: Rampage (2012–2018); Pentagram (2018–2019)
- Based in: Tokyo, Japan
- Colors: Red and black
- Owner: Kayoko Hayashi
- Head coach: Nobushiro "hAFu" Kodama
- Manager: Takuya "Aotaka" Fujita
- General manager: Hiroki "MizuRussian" Nakamura

Pentagram was a Japanese professional esports organization based in Tokyo. It was originally known as Rampage (Note: Previously known as myRevenge Rampage (2012–2013) and Ozone Rampage (2013–2015) for sponsorship reasons.) from its creation in September 2012 until its rebranding on 10 January 2018. The organization had a League of Legends team that participated in the League of Legends Japan League (LJL), the top level of professional League of Legends in Japan, and a PlayerUnknown's Battlegrounds team that competed in domestic tournaments.

== League of Legends ==
=== History ===
==== As Rampage ====
On 16 December 2015, the organization terminated its contract with its primary sponsor, Ozone Gaming Gear, and dropped "Ozone" from its name. Rampage replaced its entire roster in preparation for the 2016 competitive season, signing top laner Shirou "Paz" Sasaki, jungler Lee "Tussle" Moon-yong, mid laner Hiroki "Roki" Yokoo, bot laner Kiichi "Meron" Watanabe, and support Jeon "Dara" Jeong-hoon. The new roster placed third in the regular season of the 2016 LJL Spring Split and second in playoffs after losing 0–3 to longtime rivals DetonatioN FocusMe (DFM) in the grand finals. Rampage managed to place first in both the regular season and playoffs of the 2016 LJL Summer Split after defeating DFM 3–2 in a close series in the grand finals. This qualified them for the 2016 International Wild Card Qualifier (IWCQ), where they failed to qualify for the 2016 World Championship after losing 0–3 to Beşiktaş.

Top laner Paz and mid laner Roki were replaced by Shunsuke "Evi" Murase and Osamu "Ramune" Ozawa respectively prior to start of the 2017 competitive season. Rampage placed second in the regular season and first in playoffs in both the spring and summer splits of the 2017 season, facing DFM in the grand finals both times. The team's spring split victory qualified them for the 2017 Mid-Season Invitational, where they placed last in Group A of the play-in stage with a 1–5 record, and their summer split victory qualified them for the 2017 World Championship, where they placed last in Group D of the play-in stage with a 0–4 record.

==== As Pentagram ====
It was announced on 12 January 2018 that Rampage had rebranded and renamed to PENTAGRAM. Ramune and YutoriMoyasi remained on the team after the rebranding, while top laner Shirou "Paz" Sasaki, jungler Jang "Once" Se-yeong, and support Yang "Gaeng" Gwang-yu joined to complete PENTAGRAM's inaugural roster. On 5 February 2018, Riot Games Japan announced that PENTAGRAM would be penalized for withholding Dara and Tussle's residency cards. PENTAGRAM was forced to surrender the first game of each of their first five matches in the 2018 LJL Spring Split, while manager Takuya "Aotaka" Fujita and general manager Hiroki "MizuRussian" Nakamura were suspended from any involvement in the LJL or LJLCS for three competitive months.

PENTAGRAM finished second in the regular season of the 2018 LJL Spring Split, qualifying for playoffs, where they defeated USG 3–1 and DFM 3–0 in the semifinals and finals respectively to be crowned 2018 LJL Spring champions. This qualified the team for the 2018 Mid-Season Invitational, where they were placed in Group B of the play-in stage, along with Turkish team SuperMassive, Brazilian team KaBuM! e-Sports, and Australian team Dire Wolves. PENTAGRAM finished last in their group (fourth) and in the event overall (fourteenth) with a 1–5 record, only managing to take a single game off the Dire Wolves. After the Mid-Season Invitational, PENTAGRAM was one of three teams that represented the LJL at Rift Rivals 2018.

PENTAGRAM made no changes to their roster in preparation for the 2018 LJL Summer Split. The team placed third in both the regular season and playoffs. On 30 November 2018, Riot Games Japan announced that it would not offer PENTAGRAM a spot in the upcoming 2019 LJL Spring Split, and that it was looking for other organizations to join the soon-to-be franchised LJL. PENTAGRAM responded to the announcement shortly afterwards, saying that it would disband its League of Legends division.

=== Controversy ===
In December 2017, the team's management allegedly confiscated the residence cards of their two Korean players, Jeon "Dara" Jeong-hoon and Lee "Tussle" Moon-yong, putting them at risk of a hefty fine and imprisonment. Foreign residents of Japan are required by law to have their residence cards on them at all times, readily available for presentation if requested by law enforcement. Dara accused manager Takuya "Aotaka" Fujita of threatening him while his residence card was being held, shouting, "If you don't leave your [residence] card here, you can't leave the team. This residence card is the property of the team." Aotaka's actions outraged the Japanese League of Legends community, and a subsequent investigation by Riot Games Japan determined that the incident had indeed taken place. As punishment, the team was forced to surrender the first game of their first five series in the 2018 LJL Spring Split, while Aotaka and general manager Hiroki "MizuRussian" Nakamura were suspended from any involvement in the LJL or LJLCS for three competitive months. Dara retired from competitive play on 4 May 2018, citing his experience with PENTAGRAM as the primary factor, saying "I can't play [League of Legends] without throwing up. ... My spirit is broken. I am returning to South Korea." PENTAGRAM responded shortly after with a statement acknowledging their malpractice of confiscating Dara and Tussle's residence cards but denying that they had threatened the players. The statement was met with a largely negative response from the Japanese League of Legends community. Dara described the statement as "untrue", claiming that the team's management confiscated the residence cards to pressure him and Tussle into leaving the team of their own volition.

== PlayerUnknown's Battlegrounds ==
From June to November 2018, PENTAGRAM sponsored Japanese players poly and kr10, who participated in the first season of the PUBG Japan Series. In February 2019, PENTAGRAM announced a four-man roster consisting of albert, notNoir, Sumoken, and tyapatu. The team competed as PENTAGRAM Revive in PJS Season 2 and finished 12th overall. PENTAGRAM announced the disbandment of its PUBG team on 18 April 2019.
