= Ground Zero Gaming =

Australian esports organisation

- Short name: GZ
- Games: Counter-Strike 2; League of Legends; Rocket League
- Founded: 2017
- League: League of Legends Championship Pacific
- Location: Australia (organisation); Taiwan (League of Legends team)
- Website: www.groundzerogaming.com.au

Ground Zero Gaming (GZ) is an Australian esports organisation. It has professional teams competing in Counter-Strike 2, League of Legends, and Rocket League. Its League of Legends team is based in Taiwan and competes in the League of Legends Championship Pacific, the top professional league for the game in the Asia-Pacific. Outside of professional competition, Ground Zero also organises and hosts esports tournaments in Australia.

== League of Legends ==
Ground Zero joined the professional League of Legends scene in 2018, playing one season in the Oceanic Challenger Series, the secondary league of the Oceanic Pro League (OPL). In 2022 Ground Zero acquired the ORDER's spot in the League of Legends Circuit Oceania (LCO), the successor to the OPL. The team later won both splits of the 2024 season and competed in the playoffs of the Pacific Championship Series (PCS). After that year, Ground Zero moved to the PCS after the LCO was discontinued and the PCS was demoted to a secondary league for Asia-Pacific teams.

Following the 2025 season, Riot Games announced that Ground Zero had been chosen as a guest team to replace partner team PSG Talon in the League of Legends Championship Pacific (LCP); PSG had been removed from the league for failing to pay its players and staff. Because LCP matches are played in-person in Taiwan, Ground Zero opted to rebuild with a Taiwanese roster in mind, despite fans' hope of Oceania's return to the LCP following The Chiefs Esports Club's relegation at the end of the 2025 LCP season.
