= League of Legends Championship Pacific =

Esports league in the Asia-Pacific

- Current season, competition or edition: 2026 LCP season
- Game: League of Legends
- Founded: 29 September 2024; 2 years ago
- First season: 2025
- Owner: Riot Games
- Director: Piotr Pilich
- Organising body: Riot Games; Carry International
- No. of teams: 8
- Region: Asia-Pacific (Note: Excluding South Korea and China.)
- Venues: LCP Arena, Taipei
- Most recent champion: Team Secret Whales (3rd title) (LCP 2026 Split 3)
- Most titles: CTBC Flying Oyster; Team Secret Whales (3 titles)
- Qualification: Franchise partnership
- Relegation to: Guest teams only: Pacific Championship Series; Vietnam Championship Series; League of Legends Japan League
- International cups: First Stand Tournament; Mid-Season Invitational; World Championship
- Related competitions: CBLOL, LCK, LCS, LEC, LPL
- Website: www.lolesports.com

The League of Legends Championship Pacific (LCP) is a professional esports league for League of Legends teams competing in the Asia-Pacific region. (Note: Riot Games also uses the term "LCP region", which includes competitors from Taiwan, Hong Kong, Macau, Japan, South Asia, Southeast Asia and Oceania.) Riot Games, the game's developer, and tournament organizer Carry International created the league on 29 September 2024. This followed an announcement in June by Riot in which they planned to form a single tournament to replace the Pacific Championship Series (PCS) and Vietnam Championship Series (VCS) as a tier-one league. Both leagues, alongside the League of Legends Japan League (LJL), which was integrated into the PCS for the 2024 season, became tier-two leagues.

The LCP utilizes a hybrid franchise and promotion and relegation model, similar to the Valorant Champions Tour (VCT) in Riot's tactical shooter Valorant. Three teams are partners of the league and cannot be relegated, while another five are guest teams that can be relegated to the PCS, VCS, LJL or other sub-regional leagues based on their location.

The LCP is currently made up of four organizations from Vietnam, three organizations from Taiwan (Note: The LCP refers to Taiwan as "Taipei" in its official publications.) and one from Japan. With the exception of some touring events, all games of the LCP are played live at the LCP Arena in Taipei, Taiwan. In addition to a small studio audience, all games are streamed live on Twitch and YouTube.

== History ==
=== Prior to the LCP ===
The first professional esports league for League of Legends players in Taiwan, Hong Kong, Macau, and Southeast Asia was the Garena Premier League (GPL), which ran from 2012 to mid-2018 and ran by Garena, who distributed the game in those regions. Teams from Taiwan, Hong Kong, and Macau were given their own league, the League of Legends Master Series (LMS), in late 2014. Three years later, the Vietnam Championship Series (VCS) was upgraded to a Tier 1 tournament and Vietnam became its own competitive region, separate from the rest of Southeast Asia. The GPL was rebranded as the League of Legends SEA Tour (LST) in mid-2018.

On 25 September 2019, Garena announced its intention to merge the LMS and LST into a single league. This was fully announced by Riot Games as the Pacific Championship Series (PCS) on 19 December for a 2020 start. The league, whilst originally franchised to feature 10 teams, would shrink to 8 teams for Spring 2024 (following a relegation series demoting Impunity Esports and Dewish Team whilst the promoted teams, Nate9527 and PSG Talon Academy, did not secure sponsors in time) and 7 for Summer 2024 (when Beyond Gaming closed operations). The PCS would merge with Oceania's league, the League of Legends Circuit Oceania (LCO), in time for the 2023 season, giving the two best LCO teams spots in the PCS playoffs instead of the league qualifying for international tournaments on their own.

Japan's professional esports league for League of Legends, the League of Legends Japan League (LJL), was formed in 2014. Throughout the course of the league's history, DetonatioN FocusMe (DFM) dominated the competition, scoring 16 LJL titles and representing the region several times in international competition. On 26 November 2023, Riot announced that the league would become part of the PCS, much like Oceania, for the 2024 season. During the season, DFM's dominance would be replaced by that of Fukuoka SoftBank Hawks Gaming (owned by the Nippon Professional Baseball (NPB) team of the same name), who won both LJL splits and finished as PCS runners-up in Spring and Summer, qualifying for the 2024 World Championship in the process.

=== Formation ===
On 11 June 2024, Riot Games released a blog post titled "LoL Esports: Building Towards a Brighter Future", in which they would overhaul the competitive scene for 2025. Among these changes were the announcement of an 8-team pan-Asia-Pacific tournament that would take the place of the PCS and VCS as a tier-1 league. This league was announced to feature a hybrid promotion and relegation system, with some teams being franchise partners of the league while others were guests that would be relegated. On 19 July Riot publicly announced that the league would consist of four partners and four guest teams. The league would officially launch as the League of Legends Championship Pacific on 29 September, with the format for the inaugural season announced on 1 November and the teams revealed on 3 November.

Despite being part of the larger Asia-Pacific region, it was announced on 20 September 2024 that the LCO had folded. It would be replaced by the Oceania Promotion Qualifier (OPQ) in 2025 and FLASH Oceania in 2026, both of which sent one team to have a shot at being promoted to the LCP.

=== Re-regionalisation ===
On 21 September 2026, following the 2026 LCP season, Riot Games announced that the LCP would change its format for 2027, making the eight teams that would make up the league reintegrate into their regional leagues which would then be used to qualify teams for the LCP (akin to the old GPL/LST format).

== Format ==
As of the 2026 season, the format is as follows:

=== Split 1 ===
The eight teams compete in a single best-of-three round-robin regular season. The top six teams advance to the knockout stage. The knockout stage features a best-of-five hybrid-elimination bracket. The first round is single-elimination between the third to sixth seeds, with the winners advancing to a double-elimination bracket with the top two seeds. The winner qualifiers for the First Stand Tournament as the LCP's representative.

=== Split 2 ===
The Split 2 format replicates the Split 1 format. The winner qualifies for the Mid-Season Invitational as the LCP's first seed. The team with the most championship points among non-qualifiers at the end of Split 2 also qualifies for MSI as the LCP's second seed.

=== Split 3 ===
The eight teams compete in a Swiss-system tournament. Initial matches are best-of-three while qualification and elimination matches are best-of-five. The four teams to secure three wins advance to the playoffs, with additional seeding matches to be played to determine final seeding.

The playoffs features a best-of-five double-elimination bracket. The top two teams qualify for the World Championship as the LCP's top two seeds. The team with the most championship points among non-qualifiers at the end of Split 3 also qualifies for Worlds as the LCP's third seed. It is unknown which team receives the fourth seed should the LCP be given an additional Worlds slot via MSI.

=== Promotion Tournament ===
At the end of the season, up to three guest teams with the least amount of championship points participate in the Promotion Tournament. Guest teams competing in Worlds are exempted from the Promotion Tournament.

- The guest team with the least championship points will compete for the Free-for-All slot against the winners of all LCP component leagues and the Wild Card Playoffs.
- A second guest team will compete for the Regional Merit slot, where the team plays against the winner from its original domestic league in a single best-of-five series. That league will also not compete for the Free-for-All slot. The second guest team will be selected based on the following criteria:
  - If multiple eligible guest teams come from the same region, the lowest-ranked team among them will compete for the Regional Merit slot.
  - If all remaining eligible guest teams come from different regions, the lowest-ranked team among them will compete for the Regional Merit slot (i.e. the guest team with the second-least championship points).
- Academy teams from a lower-tiered league (tier 2 or Wild Card) are ineligible to participate in either the Promotion Tournament or Wild Card Playoffs.

As the 2026 Promotion Tournament, the following domestic teams are eligible for promotion to LCP:

- Japan: League of Legends Japan League (LJL) Finals champion
- Oceania: Oceanic Promotion Qualifier (OPQ) champion
- TW/HK/MO: Pacific Championship Series (PCS) Split 3 champion
- Vietnam: Vietnam Championship Series (VCS) Finals champion
- LCP Wild Card Playoffs champion

==== Wild Card Playoffs ====
Aside from the LCP component regions, teams from other domestic leagues are also eligible for promotion via the LCP Wild Card. Starting from the 2027 Promotion Tournament, Wild Card regions compete in open qualifiers for a slot in the Wild Card Playoffs. There are three regional qualifiers for Indonesia/Malaysia/Singapore, the Philippines, and Thailand; followed by a Last Chance Qualifier for all eligible regions.

== Teams ==
In 2025 and 2026, eight teams made up the league. This consisted of a number partner teams that cannot be relegated, with the remaining teams taking up guest slots that can be relegated to the domestic leagues below the LCP (currently consisting of the PCS, VCS, LJL and regional competitions in Southeast Asia and Oceania) based on their location.

For the league's inaugural season, there were four partner teams and four guest teams, with the guests consisting of two merit slots for the best non-partnered team in both the 2024 PCS and VCS Summer splits, as well as two additional teams. In 2026, following Talon's removal from the LCP, a fifth guest slot was awarded to Ground Zero Gaming. For 2027, while teams will start from the domestic level, the eight teams that would have started from the LCP will still receive part of the Global Revenue Pool.

=== Current teams ===
Team	Joined
Partner teams
CTBC Flying Oyster	3 November 2024
GAM Esports (Note: GAM Esports were guaranteed a guest spot in the LCP by winning the VCS Summer 2024 season, but were announced as a partnered team on 3 November 2024.)	18 August 2024
SoftBank Hawks (Note: Their official name is Fukuoka SoftBank Hawks Gaming, as they are owned by Japanese baseball club Fukuoka SoftBank Hawks.)	3 November 2024
Guest teams
Deep Cross Gaming	3 October 2025
Ground Zero Gaming (Note: On 18 November 2025, Riot Games announced that PSG Talon would be removed from the LCP due to Talon's "financial issues", including failure to pay its staff members in a timely fashion. Their replacement would be Ground Zero Gaming as a guest from the PCS region.)	22 December 2025
MVK Esports (Note: MVK Esports (formerly MGN Vikings Esports) qualified via the VCS merit spot as the runners-up of the 2024 Summer season; GAM Esports, the winners of the season, were selected as a partnered team.)	3 November 2024
Saigon Warriors	13 November 2026
Team Secret Whales (Note: Team Whales were invited to the LCP as a guest team on 3 November 2024. On 6 December 2024, Team Secret announced that they had take a partnership with Team Whales, and competing with name as "Team Secret Whales".)	3 November 2024

=== Former teams ===
Team	Joined	Left	Reason
Chiefs Esports Club	3 November 2024	3 October 2025	Relegated
DetonatioN FocusMe (Note: DetonatioN FocusMe qualified via the PCS merit spot as the 5th place team in the 2024 Summer season; 1st place PSG Talon, 2nd place SoftBank Hawks and 4th place CTBC Flying Oyster were all selected as partnered teams, while 3rd place Frank Esports wasn't selected.)	3 November 2024	13 November 2026	Relegated
PSG Talon (Note: PSG Talon were guaranteed a guest spot in the LCP by winning the PCS Summer 2024 season, but were announced as a partnered team on 3 November 2024. On 5 January 2025, PSG Esports ended their partnership with Talon Esports, and Talon kept their partnership slot in the LCP. On 15 July 2025, the partnership was resumed. However, Talon Esports was removed by Riot Games from both the LCP and the Valorant's VCT Pacific on 18 November 2025, due to their "financial issues", including failure to pay its staff members in a timely fashion; the partnership with PSG was also ended again.)	1 September 2024	18 November 2025	Removed

== Results ==
Year	Split	Champions	Runners-up	Third-place
2025	Season Kickoff	CTBC Flying Oyster	Talon Esports	MGN Vikings Esports
2025	Mid-Season	CTBC Flying Oyster	GAM Esports	Talon Esports
2025	Season Finals	CTBC Flying Oyster	Team Secret Whales	PSG Talon
2026	Split 1	Team Secret Whales	Deep Cross Gaming	SoftBank Hawks
2026	Split 2	Team Secret Whales	Deep Cross Gaming	GAM Esports
2026	Split 3	Team Secret Whales	CTBC Flying Oyster	MVK Esports
