= Daejeon Convention Center =

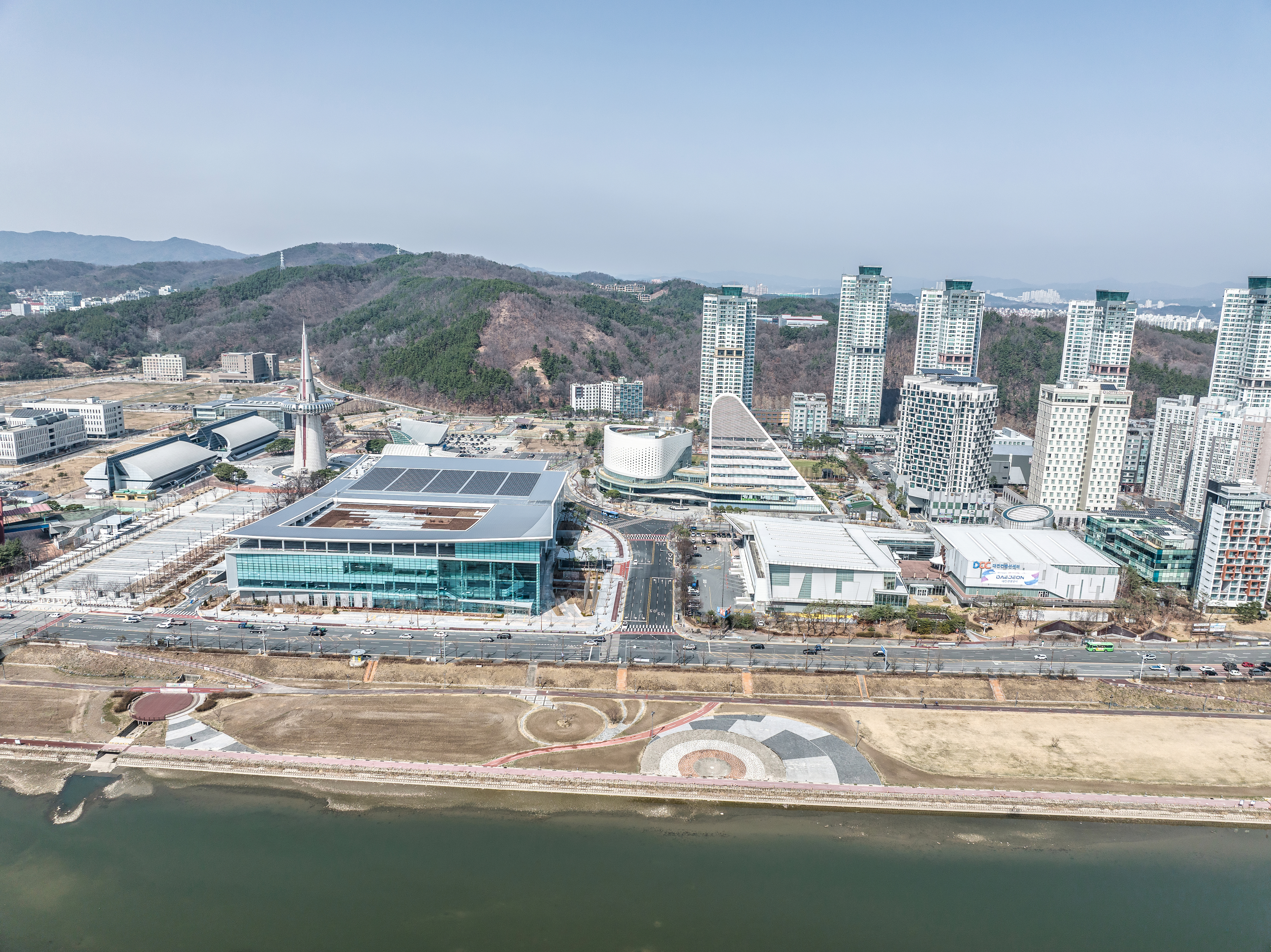
- Daejeon Convention Center I (right) and II (left)
- Interactive map of the Daejeon Convention Center area

General information
- Type: Exhibition and conference center
- Location: 107 Expo-ro, Yuseong District, Daejeon, South Korea
- Coordinates: 36.375040°N 127.392217°E
- Opening: 21 April 2008
- Owner: Daejeon Tourism Organization

Design and construction
- Architects: Tomoon Architects & Engineers

Website
- www.dcckorea.or.kr

Daejeon Convention Center (Korean: 대전컨벤션센터), also known as simply DCC, is the convention center run by the Daejeon Tourism Organization and the sole convention center for the city.

== Facilities ==
The first building, known as DCC1, was opened in 2008 with four exhibition halls and three medium-sized meeting rooms on the first floor and two grand ballrooms on the second floor. DCC2 opened in 2022 with a usable space of 49,754 square meters, which is roughly four times as much space as DCC1. The new building can accommodate 8,000 people. It is a three-story structure with four exhibition halls on the first floor and three meeting rooms on the third floor. DCC2 was built on the site of the Daejeon Trade Exhibition Hall.

== See also ==
- Expo Science Park
- Institute for Basic Science
- National Science Museum
