= DetonatioN FocusMe =

Japanese esports organization

- Short name: DFM
- Games: Full list: Apex Legends; eFootball; Fortnite; Hearthstone; League of Legends; PUBG Mobile; Shadowverse; Splatoon 3; Street Fighter V; Super Smash Bros.; Valorant
- Founded: July 2012; 13 years ago
- Based in: Tokyo, Japan
- Colors: Blue and black
- CEO: Nobuyuki "LGraN" Umezaki
- Website: team-detonation.net

DetonatioN FocusMe (DFM) (Note: Japanese: デトネーション・フォーカスミー, romanized: Detonēshon Fōkasumī) is a Japanese esports organization with professional teams competing across several titles. It was established as a Counter-Strike Online team named DetonatioN Gaming (DNG) in July 2012.

"DetonatioN FocusMe" was originally the name of the organization's League of Legends division, which began as an amateur team named "FocusMe". It also had a sister team DetonatioN Rabbit Five until 2015, when Riot Games applied the rule "one organization – one team" in every top league. DetonatioN FocusMe competes in the League of Legends Japan League (LJL), the country's top-level league for the game. The team qualified for the League of Legends World Championship in 2018, 2019, 2021, and 2022. During the 2021 World Championship, DetonatioN FocusMe placed first in their play-in group and automatically qualified for the group stage of the main event. This marked the first time an LJL team had advanced to the main event of an international tournament.

== League of Legends ==
DetonatioN FocusMe League of Legends
- Short name: DFM
- Game: League of Legends
- Founded: April 2013
- League: JCG Premier League (2013–2014); LJL (2014–2024); LCP (2025–present)
- Championships: 20 (4× JCG & 16× LJL)

=== History ===
==== JCG Premier League (2013–2014) ====
The organization's League of Legends division began as an unsponsored amateur team named FocusMe, competing independently until it was acquired and renamed by DetonatioN Gaming. DetonatioN FocusMe's first roster consisted of top laner Kodai "Gorira13" Ichimichi, jungler Noritaka "Anelace" Takehara, mid laner Kyohei "Ceros" Yoshida, bot laner Yuta "Yutapon" Sugiura, and Ryota "Maa" Nakano. Prior to the creation of the League of Legends Japan League (LJL) in mid-2014, DetonatioN FocusMe participated in the JCG Premier League, finishing in the top four of the league for all but one season.

DetonatioN FocusMe placed last out of four teams in the LJL's inaugural season, but would later go on to win the second season of the LJL in the same year. That victory gave the team an invitation to South Korea's NLB Summer 2014, where they lost in the first round of the Gold League to Prime Sentinel. Afterwards, DetonatioN FocusMe placed first in the 2014 LJL Summer Split's regular season, moving on to the grand finals, where they defeated Rascal Jester 3–2 in a close series.

==== LJL (2014–2024) ====
On 23 January 2015, DetonatioN FocusMe became Japan's first full-time professional League of Legends team by introducing salaries and a gaming house as living accommodation, something other organizations in Japan had previously avoided due to the country's stigma on professional gaming. After winning the 2015 LJL Season 1 finals in a 3–0 victory over sister team DetonatioN RabbitFive, DetonatioN FocusMe attended the 2015 International Wildcard Invitational (IWCI). The team only managed to secure a single victory over Kaos Latin Gamers in the group stage, ending with a 1–5 record and placing 6th out of seven teams. In the 2015 LJL Season 2, DetonatioN FocusMe placed second but later won the grand finals once again, securing a spot in the 2015 International Wildcard Tournament in Turkey. DetonatioN FocusMe took surprising victories over Australian team Chiefs Esports Club and Thai team Bangkok Titans on the first day of competition, but later lost all their remaining games on the second day and ultimately placed last.

For the 2016 LJL Spring Split, DetonatioN FocusMe acquired jungler Yun "Catch" Sang-ho and support Han "viviD" Gi-hun from SBENU Sonicboom. The team would go on to place first in the regular season, having only lost two games and ending with a 10–0 series record. In the grand finals, DetonatioN FocusMe swept their rivals Rampage 3–0, qualifying them for the 2016 IWCI. DetonatioN FocusMe placed fifth at the 2016 IWCI with a 3–4 record, failing to move on to the qualifying brackets. In the 2016 LJL Summer Split, DetonatioN FocusMe placed second in the regular season and in playoffs, behind Rampage in both cases.

In both the 2017 LJL Spring and 2017 LJL Summer Splits, DetonatioN FocusMe placed first in the regular season but lost to Rampage in the grand finals. DetonatioN FocusMe was one of three teams that represented the LJL at Rift Rivals 2017 GPL-LJL-OPL, which the league won after a 3–1 victory over the representatives of Southeast Asia's Garena Premier League (GPL).

DetonatioN FocusMe dominated the regular season of the LJL 2018 Spring Split, dropping only three games and ending in first place with a 10–0 series record. However, they lost to Pentagram (formerly Rampage) 0–3 in the grand finals. In the LJL 2018 Summer Split, DetonatioN FocusMe dominated the league once again, ending the regular season in 1st with a 9–1 series record. Unlike the previous split, DetonatioN FocusMe won the grand finals against Unsold Stuff Gaming 3–1, qualifying the team for their first ever appearance at the World Championship.

In the 2018 World Championship play-in stage, DetonatioN FocusMe was drawn into Group C with North American team Cloud9 and Brazilian team KaBuM! e-Sports. After winning two games against KaBuM! e-Sports (which included a tiebreaker), DetonatioN FocusMe became the first Japanese team to win any number of games at the World Championship and the first Japanese team to qualify for the second round of the World Championship play-in stage. Unfortunately, DetonatioN FocusMe was knocked out of the event by Edward Gaming, who they lost to 0–3 in the second round.

DetonatioN FocusMe had a dominant regular season in the 2019 LJL Spring Split, losing only a single game to Sengoku Gaming and ending in first place with a 20–1 record. This directly qualified the team for the grand finals, where they swept Unsold Stuff Gaming 3–0 to qualify for the 2019 Mid-Season Invitational as the LJL's representative.

DetonatioN FocusMe was placed in Group B of the first round of the 2019 Mid-Season Invitational play-in stage, along with Russian team Vega Squadron, Brazilian team INTZ e-Sports, and Thai team MEGA Esports. The team ended second in their group and eighth to ninth overall with a 4–2 record, failing to qualify for the second round of the play-in stage.

In the 2019 LJL Summer Split DetonatioN FocusMe finished first in both the regular season and playoffs, defeating V3 Esports in the latter to qualify for the 2019 World Championship.

For the 2021 World Championship play-in stage, DetonatioN FocusMe was drawn into Group B, along with North America's Cloud9, Taiwan's Beyond Gaming, Russia's Unicorns of Love, and Turkey's Galatasaray Esports. DetonatioN FocusMe tied Cloud9 for first in their group and, after winning their tiebreaker match, became the first LJL team to advance to the main event of a World Championship.

=== Roster ===
DetonatioN FocusMe League of Legends roster
Players
Coaches

| Role | Handle | Name | Nationality |
|---|---|---|---|
| Top | RayFraky | Minato Shinohara | Japan |
| Jungle | Citrus | Byeon Ji-woong | South Korea |
| Mid | Keine | Kim Joon-cheol | South Korea |
| Bot | Kakkun | Kamon Nomoto | Japan |
| Support | Gaeng | Yang Gwang-woo | South Korea |

Head coach

Shirou "Paz" Sasaki

Assistant coach(es)

Lee "TaNa" Sang-wook

Legend:
- (I) Inactive
- (S) Suspended
- Substitute
- (injured) Injury / Illness

Roster updated 9 January 2026.

== Valorant ==
=== Roster ===
Detonation FocusMe Valorant roster
Players
Coaches

| Handle | Name | Nationality |
|---|---|---|
| Meiy | Seki, Ibuki | Japan |
| akame | Yu, Gwang-hui | South Korea |
| Caedye | Okakura, Amon | Japan |
| yatsuka | Ikeda, Kazuya | Japan |
| SSeeS | Okimura, Tomonori | Japan |

Head coach

- Kakeru "Vorz" Ikarashi

Assistant coach(es)

- Tsubasa "NorthernLights" Ando
- Hirotaka "Melofovia" Okazaki

Legend:
- (I) Inactive
- (S) Suspended
- Substitute
- (injured) Injury / Illness

Latest roster transaction: 1 January 2026.
