= League of Legends Japan League =

Japanese esport league

- Game: League of Legends
- First season: 2014
- Owners: Riot Games Japan; PlayBrain
- Motto: "Reforge as One"
- No. of teams: 12–16 (regular season); 6 (LJL Finals)
- Countries: Japan
- Most recent champion: QT DIG∞ (1st title)
- Most titles: DetonatioN FocusMe (16 titles)
- Qualification: Franchise partnership(2019–2024); Open qualifiers (2025–present)
- Broadcaster: Twitch
- Promotion to: League of Legends Championship Pacific (2025–present)
- Website: ljl.gg

The League of Legends Japan League (LJL) is the top level of professional League of Legends competition in Japan. The league franchised prior to start of the 2019 season and had eight teams under partnership (which became six in 2024).

Before 2024, the spring and summer champions qualified for the Mid-Season Invitational and World Championship respectively. However, in 2024, the top three teams from each LJL split were seeded into the Pacific Championship Series (PCS) playoffs and competed with other PCS teams for a chance to represent the larger region at international events; LJL teams would no longer qualify directly to MSI and Worlds. Since 2025, the LJL is a second division to the League of Legends Championship Pacific (LCP).

Each annual season of play is divided into three splits, Forge, Storm and Ignite, which then conclude a with playoff tournament known as the LJL Finals. The winner of the LJL Finals qualifies for the LCP Promotion Tournament for the opportunity to qualify for the Asia-Pacific tier one league.

== Format ==
=== Regular season ===
==== Open Qualifiers ====
- Prior to each split, up to sixty-four teams participate in open qualifiers.
- Depending on the number of teams entered, up to eight groups of eight are held, single round robin best-of-ones.
- The top sixteen teams compete in a single elimination bracket, with all matches being best-of-threes.
  - Depending on how many spots need to be filled, loser's playoffs will be held after the qualifying round, also best-of-threes, to determine the remaining spots.

==== Forge ====
- The best teams from the prior season still existing (plus the remaining open qualifier teams) participate in a sixteen-team Swiss stage.
  - All rounds in the Swiss stage are best-of-ones, with the prior season's best teams seeded ahead of the open qualifier teams.
- The best eight teams advance to the playoffs, with the quarter-finals and semi-finals being best-of-threes and final being a best of five.

==== Storm ====
- Top 4 from the Forge split, plus an LCP academy team and top top seven or eight teams from open qualifiers (depending on the performance of the LCP academy team), participate in a three-set "Storm Swiss" stage, consisting of best-of-ones.
  - During the first two rounds of each set, teams face the teams with the same records. In the third round, as only 3 teams can have a 2–0 record and 3 teams can have a 0–2, one 1–1 team will be randomly drawn into the 2–0 group, while another 1–1 team will be randomly drawn into the 0–2 group.
  - Teams receive points for each set separately based on that set's win-loss record: 5 points for a 3–0 record, 3 points for a 2–1 record, 1 point for a 1–2 record and none for a 0–3 record.
- The best six teams after accumulating points of the three sets advance to the playoffs, with the quarter-finals and semi-finals being best-of-threes and final being a best of five.
  - The top 2 teams earn a bye to the semi-finals.

==== Ignite ====
- Top 4 from the Storm split, plus an LCP academy team and top top seven or eight teams from open qualifiers (depending on the performance of the LCP academy team), participate in a "Bounty" stage, lasting 6 rounds and consisting of best-of-ones.
  - Teams earn 10 points plus triple the number of wins of their opponent per win (maximum of 25 points) and 4 points per loss. These points will be added into the championship points for LJL Finals.
  - After each round, the lowest-ranked teams choose their opponents for the next round.
- The best six teams advance to the playoffs, with the quarter-finals and semi-finals being best-of-threes and final being a best of five.
  - The top 2 teams on points earn a bye to the semi-finals.

=== LJL Finals ===
- The top six teams in championship points, earned from the regular season, participate in the LJL Finals, a double-elimination bracket.
  - The top four teams start in the upper bracket, whilst 5th-6th start in the lower bracket.
- All matches are best of fives.
- Winner qualifies for the League of Legends Championship Pacific Promotion Playoffs and has a chance of entering the LCP as a guest team.

== Teams ==
=== Notable ===
As of 2025 season:

Team	ID
Burning Core Toyama	BCT
DetonatioN FocusMe Academy (Note: Academy team of DetonatioN FocusMe, who compete in the League of Legends Championship Pacific (LCP).)	DFM.A
QT DIG∞ (Note: Formerly known as Sengoku Gaming.)	QTD
REJECT	RC
V3 Esports	V3
VARREL Youth	VLY
Yang Yang Gaming	YYG

=== Former ===
- 7th heaven
- DetonatioN RabbitFive (Note: DetonatioN FocusMe's sister team.)
- Okinawan Tigers
- Pentagram (Note: Formerly Rampage,)
- SCARZ
- Unsold Stuff Gaming
- Rascal Jester
- FENNEL
- AXIZ (Note: Merged to AXIZ Crest in December 2023.)
- Crest Gaming Act
- Fukuoka SoftBank Hawks Gaming (Note: Announced as a partner team in the League of Legends Championship Pacific (LCP) in November 2024.)
- DetonatioN FocusMe (Note: Announced as a guest team in the League of Legends Championship Pacific (LCP) in November 2024. Their academy team currently competes in the LJL.)
- AXIZ Crest (Note: Merger between AXIZ and Crest Gaming Act.)
- Spirit Quartz Gaming

== Past seasons ==
Year	Split	1st	2nd	3rd
Tier 1 era (2014 - 2023)
2014	Winter	Rascal Jester	Ozone Rampage	Okinawan Tigers
2014	Spring	DetonatioN FocusMe	Rascal Jester	Ozone Rampage
2014	Summer	DetonatioN FocusMe	Ozone Rampage	Rascal Jester
2014	Grand Final	DetonatioN FocusMe	Rascal Jester	
2015	Season 1	DetonatioN FocusMe	DetonatioN RabbitFive	7th heaven
2015	Season 2	Ozone Rampage	DetonatioN FocusMe	7th heaven
2015	Grand Final	DetonatioN FocusMe	Ozone Rampage	
2016	Spring	DetonatioN FocusMe	Rampage	Unsold Stuff Gaming
2016	Summer	Rampage	DetonatioN FocusMe	7th heaven
2017	Spring	Rampage	DetonatioN FocusMe	Unsold Stuff Gaming
2017	Summer	Rampage	DetonatioN FocusMe	7th heaven
2018	Spring	Pentagram	DetonatioN FocusMe	Unsold Stuff Gaming
2018	Summer	DetonatioN FocusMe	Unsold Stuff Gaming	PENTAGRAM
2019	Spring	DetonatioN FocusMe	Unsold Stuff Gaming	Crest Gaming Act
2019	Summer	DetonatioN FocusMe	V3 Esports	Crest Gaming Act
2020	Spring	DetonatioN FocusMe	Sengoku Gaming	V3 Esports
2020	Summer	V3 Esports	DetonatioN FocusMe	Sengoku Gaming
2021	Spring	DetonatioN FocusMe	V3 Esports	Rascal Jester
2021	Summer	DetonatioN FocusMe	Rascal Jester	AXIZ
2022	Spring	DetonatioN FocusMe	Sengoku Gaming	Rascal Jester
2022	Summer	DetonatioN FocusMe	Sengoku Gaming	Fukuoka SHG
2023	Spring	DetonatioN FocusMe	Sengoku Gaming	FENNEL; Fukuoka SHG
2023	Summer	DetonatioN FocusMe	Fukuoka SHG	Sengoku Gaming
Tier 2 era (2024 - present)
2024	Spring	Fukuoka SHG (PCS 2024 Spring Playoff #2)	DetonatioN FocusMe (PCS 2024 Spring Playoff #7)	V3 Esports (PCS 2024 Spring Playoff #10-11)
2024	Summer	Fukuoka SHG (PCS 2024 Summer Playoff #2)	DetonatioN FocusMe (PCS 2024 Summer Playoff #5-6)	Sengoku Gaming (PCS 2024 Summer Playoff #10-11)
2025	Forge	REJECT	VARREL Youth	Spirit Quartz Gaming
2025	Forge	REJECT	VARREL Youth	Burning Core Toyama
2025	Storm	REJECT	QT DIG∞	DetonatioN FocusMe Academy
2025	Storm	REJECT	QT DIG∞	Burning Core Toyama
2025	Ignite	REJECT	Burning Core Toyama	QT DIG∞
2025	Ignite	REJECT	Burning Core Toyama	DetonatioN FocusMe Academy
2025	LJL Finals	QT DIG∞	REJECT	DetonatioN FocusMe Academy
