= Deep Cross Gaming =

Taiwanese esports organization

- Short name: DCG
- Games: Apex Legends; Arena of Valor; Counter-Strike 2; League of Legends
- Founded: 20 January 2022
- League: Garena Challenger Series (AoV); League of Legends Championship Pacific (LoL); Pacific Championship Series (LoL, 2022–2025)
- Based in: Taipei, Taiwan
- Partners: Logitech; Relove; Yao Yu International

Deep Cross Gaming (DCG) is a Taiwanese esports organization with teams competing in Arena of Valor, Apex Legends, Counter-Strike 2, and League of Legends. Its League of Legends team competes in the League of Legends Championship Pacific (LCP), the top-level professional league for the game in the Asia-Pacific. DCG formerly competed in the Pacific Championship Series (PCS).

== History ==
Deep Cross Gaming (DCG) was founded on 20 January 2022; it acquired a spot in the Pacific Championship Series a week later on 27 January.

== Current rosters ==
=== Apex Legends ===
Deep Cross Gaming Apex Legends roster
Players
Coaches

Handle	Name	Nationality
Chr1s878	Huang Shun-xian	Taiwan
Chisu	Su Chen-lin	Taiwan
Lu1SaN	Lee Jhen-wei	Taiwan

Head coach

- Vacant

Legend:
- (I) Inactive
- (S) Suspended
- Substitute
- (injured) Injury / Illness

Roster updated 23 April 2025.

=== Arena of Valor ===
Deep Cross Gaming Arena of Valor roster
Players
Coaches

Role	Handle	Name	Nationality
Top	Dong	Gao Jun-jie	Taiwan
Jungle	Xcen	?	Taiwan
Mid	LunLun	Hsu Ching-lun	Taiwan
Bot	DK	Jiang Jing-han	Taiwan
Support	BaiYa	Chao Yung-sheng	Taiwan
Top	Weilun	?	Taiwan

Head coach

Yen "FKZ" Hao-Che

Legend:
- (I) Inactive
- (S) Suspended
- Substitute
- (injured) Injury / Illness

Roster updated 5 April 2025.

=== Counter-Strike 2 ===
Deep Cross Gaming Counter-Strike 2 roster
Players
Coaches

Handle	Name	Nationality
WasteOfAmmo	Poluakan, Andre	Indonesia
clyd1e	Marcelo, Clyde	Philippines
xanzu	Dano, Alexander	Philippines
w1sely	Mudrakov, Aleksandr	Russia
DayMake	Malyshev, Roman	Russia

Head coach

- Vacant

Legend:
- (I) Inactive
- (S) Suspended
- Substitute
- (injured) Injury / Illness

Roster updated 12 December 2025.

=== League of Legends ===
Deep Cross Gaming League of Legends roster
Players
Coaches

Role	Handle	Name	Nationality
Top	Flauren	Lo Chak-kin	Hong Kong
Jungle	Pop9	Wu Yi-han	Taiwan
Mid	HongSuo	Guo Bei-yi	Taiwan
Bot	Feng	Chen Chun-feng	Taiwan
Support	ShiauC	Liu Chia-hao	Taiwan
Mid	XiaoXiang	Liao Yi-xiang	Taiwan

Head coach

Chen "REFRA1N" Kuan-ting

Assistant coach(es)

Chiu "Lxz" Liang-jung

Legend:
- (I) Inactive
- (S) Suspended
- Substitute
- (injured) Injury / Illness

Roster updated 14 January 2026.
