= 2023 in esports =

List of esports events in 2023 (also known as professional gaming).

== Events ==
=== Tournaments ===
| Date | Game | Event | Location | Winner(s) |
|---|---|---|---|---|
| February 7 – February 19 | Rainbow Six Siege | Six Invitational 2023 | Montreal, Canada | G2 Esports |
| March 31 – April 2 | various fighting games | Evolution Championship Series Japan | Tokyo, Japan | |
| May 8 – May 21 | Counter-Strike: Global Offensive | BLAST.tv Paris Major 2023 | Paris, France | Team Vitality |
| June 11 – June 25 | Valorant | 2023 Valorant Champions Tour: Tokyo Masters | Chiba/Tokyo, Japan | Fnatic |
| July 6 – July 9 | FIFA 23 | FIFAe Club World Cub 2023 | Riyadh, Saudi Arabia | RBLZ Gaming |
| July 11 – July 14 | FIFA 23 | FIFAe Nations Cup 2023 | Riyadh, Saudi Arabia | Brazil |
| July 16 – July 19 | FIFA 23 | FIFAe World Cup 2023 | Riyadh, Saudi Arabia | Manuel "ManuBachoore" Bachoore |
| July 19 – July 30 | Dota 2 | Riyadh Masters 2023 | Riyadh, Saudi Arabia | Team Spirit |
| July 26 – August 6 | Counter-Strike: Global Offensive | Intel Extreme Masters Cologne 2023 | Cologne, Germany | G2 Esports |
| August 3 – August 13 | Rocket League | RLCS 2022–23 World Championship | Düsseldorf, Germany | Team Vitality |
| August 4 – August 6 | various fighting games | Evolution Championship Series 2023 | Las Vegas, United States | |
| August 6 – August 26 | Valorant | Valorant Champions 2023 | Los Angeles, United States | Evil Geniuses |
| September 6 – September 10 | Apex Legends | ALGS Championship 2023 | Birmingham, England | TSM |
| October 10 – November 19 | League of Legends | League of Legends World Championship 2023 | Seoul/Busan, South Korea | T1 |
| October 12 – October 29 | Dota 2 | The International 2023 | Seattle, United States | Team Spirit |
| October 29 – November 4 | Overwatch 2 | Overwatch World Cup 2023 | Anaheim, United States | Saudi Arabia |
| October 21 – November 4 | Dota 2 eFootball 2023 | Esports at the 2023 Pan American Games | Santiago, Chile | XIX Pan American Games: Esports Medal summary |
| November 18 – December 3 | PUBG: Battlegrounds | PUBG Global Championship 2023 | Bangkok, Thailand | Danawa e-sports |
| November 24 – November 26 | Clash Royale | Clash Royale League 2023 World Finals | Helsinki, Finland | Mugi |
| December 13 – December 17 | Counter-Strike 2 | Blast Premier World Final 2023 | Abu Dhabi, UAE | Team Vitality |

=== Leagues ===
| Game | League | Winner(s) | Ref. |
|---|---|---|---|
| Call of Duty | 2023 Call of Duty League season | New York Subliners | |
| League of Legends | 2023 LCK season | Gen.G (Spring), Gen.G (Summer) | |
| League of Legends | 2023 LCS season | Cloud9 (Spring), NRG (Summer) | |
| League of Legends | 2023 LEC season | G2 Esports | |
| League of Legends | 2023 LPL season | JD Gaming (Spring), JD Gaming (Summer) | |
| League of Legends | 2023 PCS season | PSG Talon (Spring), PSG Talon (Summer) | |
| Overwatch 2 | 2023 Overwatch League season | Florida Mayhem | |
