= Talon Esports =

Esports organisation based in Hong Kong

- Short name: TLN, TALN
- Founded: 2017
- Based in: Hong Kong
- CEO: Xiao "Sean" Zhang
- Partners: New Wave Esports
- Motto: "Soar with Talon"
- Website: talon.gg

Talon Esports (stylized simply as TALON) is a professional esports organisation based in Hong Kong with teams competing across the Asia Pacific. Its Rainbow Six: Siege team ispartnered with PSG Esports and known as PSG Talon. PSG Talon League of Legends competed in the Pacific Championship Series from 2020 to 2024 and in the League of Legends Championship Pacific (LCP) in 2025. The team would be removed from the LCP following the 2025 season. Its Rainbow Six: Siege team, based in South Korea, currently competes in the BLAST R6 Asia-Pacific League's APAC North division.

== Former divisions ==
=== League of Legends ===
==== History ====
Riot Games announced on 19 December 2019 that Talon Esports would be one of ten teams participating in the newly created Pacific Championship Series. Talon Esports' inaugural roster consisted of top laner Su "Hanabi" Chia-hsiang, jungler Kim "River" Dong-woo, mid laner Kim "Candy" Seung-ju, bot laner Wong "Unified" Chun-kit, and support Ling "Kaiwing" Kai-wing.

Talon Esports finished third in the 2020 PCS Spring regular season, qualifying for the first round of playoffs in the winners' bracket. After winning three series and losing one, Talon Esports reached the finals where they faced off against Machi Esports. Talon Esports came out on top after a close series and won their first PCS title.

On 18 June 2020, Talon Esports announced that its League of Legends team had partnered with PSG Esports and would henceforth compete as PSG Talon. Mid laner Park "Tank" Dan-won was brought in as a substitute for the summer split, but was later promoted to the starting position after the departure of Candy on 9 July 2020.

In a repeat of the spring split, PSG Talon finished third in the 2020 PCS Summer regular season and reached the finals after defeating the same teams in spring. This qualified the team for the 2020 World Championship. PSG Talon later faced Machi Esports once again in a rematch of the spring finals; however, this time Machi Esports defeated PSG Talon, forcing PSG Talon to start in the play-in stage of Worlds as the PCS' second seed.

River and Tank were unable to participate in the play-in stage due to delayed visas, and were replaced with Hsiao "Kongyue" Jen-tso and Chen "Uniboy" Chang-chu respectively. Unified was also unable to participate in the first half of the play-in stage for the same reason, and was replaced with Chen "Dee" Chun-dee.

Despite starting the play-in stage with three emergency substitutes, PSG Talon won both their games on the first day of competition, including an upset victory over group favourites LGD Gaming. PSG Talon later topped their group and qualified for the tournament's main event. PSG Talon was placed in Group B for the main event, along with South Korea's DAMWON Gaming, China's JD Gaming, and Europe's Rogue. PSG Talon finished third in their group with a 2–4 win-loss record, ending their Worlds run.

PSG Talon announced the departure of Tank on 31 October 2021 and the signing of Huang "Maple" Yi-tang as his replacement on 10 December.

PSG Talon finished first in the 2021 PCS Spring regular season, losing only a single game to second-place Beyond Gaming. The team later reached their third consecutive PCS finals and swept Beyond Gaming to win their second PCS title.

Unified was unable to participate in the 2021 Mid-Season Invitational (MSI 2021) due to recurring cases of pneumothorax. He was replaced with Beyond Gaming's Chiu "Doggo" Tzu-chuan.

For the group stage of MSI 2021, PSG Talon was placed in Group B, along with Europe's MAD Lions, Brazil's paiN Gaming, and Turkey's Istanbul Wildcats. PSG Talon finished second in their group with a 4–2 win–loss record, only losing to first-place MAD Lions, and qualified for the "rumble" stage of the tournament. PSG Talon finished third out of six teams in the rumble stage, advancing to the knockout stage. In the semifinals, China's Royal Never Give Up eliminated PSG Talon from the tournament after a four-game series.

PSG Talon placed first in the 2021 PCS Summer regular season, finishing undefeated. After sweeping J Team in the semifinals, PSG Talon qualified for the 2021 World Championship and their fourth consecutive PCS finals, where they defeated Beyond Gaming after another close series.

PSG Talon's first-place finish in the 2021 summer split qualified them for the main event of the 2021 World Championship. The team was placed in Group C, along with China's Royal Never Give Up, South Korea's Hanwha Life Esports, and Europe's Fnatic. PSG Talon finished third in their group and failed to qualify for the knockout stage.

PSG Esports would temporarily end their partnership with Talon on 5 January 2025, before the start of the 2025 League of Legends Championship Pacific (LCP) season, which the team were partners in. On 15 July 2025, the partnership would resume. PSG Talon would qualify for the 2025 World Championship as the 3rd seed from the LCP, but went out of the Swiss stage winless, losing to South Korea's Gen.G and Hanwha Life Esports, as well as Brazil's Vivo Keyd Stars.

On 18 November 2025, Riot Games announced that Talon Esports would be removed from the LCP, as well as the VCT Pacific, following reports that Talon failed to pay their players and staff in a timely manner; PSG had once again ended their partnership prior to the announcement. Ultimately, Talon would be replaced in the LCP 2026 season would be replaced by Ground Zero Gaming (GZ), Australian esports organisation who had fielded a Taiwanese roster in the PCS the prior year.

=== Arena of Valor ===
==== History ====
Talon Esports extended its partnership with KFC on 31 January 2022 and gave the fast food chain naming rights to its Arena of Valor team. The team was subsequently rebranded as KFC Talon Esports.

During the Arena of Valor women's tournament at the 2025 Southeast Asian Games (of which Talon qualified to represent the host country Thailand), Naphat "Tokyogurl" Warasin was caught downloading "unauthorized third-party software" during the team's match against Vietnam. The Thai team would be disqualified from the event as a result, with Warasin also being dropped by Talon and given a lifetime ban by game publisher Garena afterwards.

The Arena of Valor division of Talon disbanded in January 2026, with the staff forming their own organization to replace Talon from the RPL 2026 season onwards known as Tenacity. This also affected Talon's planned entry into Mobile Legends: Bang Bang, as Tenacity also filled their already announced spot in the Mobile Legends: Bang Bang Super League Thailand, which would begin in 2026.

=== Overwatch ===
Talon Esports joined the professional Overwatch scene in March 2017 by signing a Taipei-based roster, with Hongkonger Yip "Moowe" Chi-yeung being the only non-Taiwanese player. The team disbanded in late July after failing to qualify for the second season of the Overwatch Pacific Championship.

In early 2018, Talon Esports signed an all-Korean roster to compete in the Pacific division of Overwatch Contenders (later Pacific Contenders). The team has since undergone several roster changes and topped various Pacific Contenders seasons.

Talon Esports accepted an offer for a spot in the Korean Contenders Trials after the Pacific Contenders was discontinued. The team disbanded in September 2022.

=== Pokémon Unite ===
Talon Esports announced in April 2023 that it would enter the Pokémon Unite Championship Series with an all-Filipino roster. The team will compete in the APAC-East Regional Qualifiers, where the top three teams get the chance to compete in the 2023 Pokémon World Championships in Yokohama, Japan. The team also has multiple opportunities to qualify for the tournament should they fail to qualify through the APAC-East Regional Qualifiers.

The team disbanded in September 2025.

=== Tom Clancy's Rainbow Six Siege ===
PSG Esports and Talon Esports announced that they had expanded their partnership to Tom Clancy's Rainbow Six Siege on 13 March 2024. The latter's existing team was subsequently rebranded under the PSG Talon name.

=== Valorant ===
On 22 September 2022, Talon Esports was announced as one of the partner teams for the Valorant APAC league. On 18 November 2025, Riot Games would remove Talon from the league following the organization's financial issues.

Ultimately, TLN's qualification for the VCT 2026 season has been replaced by Full Sense (FS) of a Thai esports organisation.

=== Counter-Strike 2 ===
In August 2017, Talon Esports was announced Counter-Strike: Global Offensive. On 2 August 2024, Talon Esports announced its re-entry into Counter-Strike 2, with a roster featuring players from Oceania.

The team disbanded in March 2025.

== Funding ==
New Wave Esports Corporation, a Canadian company which provides capital and advisory services to esports teams, announced a strategic investment in Talon Esports on 18 November 2019.

Sean Zhang, CEO and co-founder of Talon Esports, announced on 12 October 2020 that his organisation had secured US$2 million in seed funding from investors.

On 6 May 2024, the Esports World Cup Foundation, funded by the Saudi Arabia Public Investment Fund and organizers of the Esports World Cup tournament series, announced the 30 organizations (known in the EWC as Clubs) who would make up the Club Support Program, with Talon Esports being one of them. This program gave Talon a one-time six-figure stipend if they were willing to enter new esports, as well as additional funding each year if they drive viewership and fan engagement to the Esports World Cup.

On 18 November 2025, Riot Games would remove Talon Esports from both the League of Legends Championship Pacific (LCP) and Valorant Champions Tour Pacific league (VCT Pacific) following reports that the organization failed to pay its players and staff in a timely manner. Talon noted in a statement that these issues came from funding delays stemming from their most recent financing round.
