= PSG Esports =

Esports department of football club Paris Saint-Germain

Paris Saint-Germain
- Full name: Paris Saint-Germain Esports
- Short name: PSG Esports
- Teams: EA Sports FC
- Founded: 20 October 2016; 10 years ago
- Home ground: Studio PSG
- President: Nasser Al-Khelaifi
- Website: psg.fr/esports

Paris Saint-Germain Esports, commonly referred to as PSG Esports, is a French professional esports club based in Paris, France. It operates as the esports department of Paris Saint-Germain FC. The organisation currently fields teams in EA Sports FC. It has previously competed in League of Legends, Rocket League, Dota 2, FIFA Online, Brawl Stars, Mobile Legends: Bang Bang, Arena of Valor, Fortnite Battle Royale, and Tom Clancy's Rainbow Six Siege. Its headquarters and training centre are located at the PSG Studio in Boulogne-Billancourt, which also hosts the Paris Saint-Germain Academy Esports.

Founded in 2016, PSG Esports entered competitive esports through League of Legends and EA Sports FC before expanding into multiple titles. The organisation has competed across a variety of esports scenes, establishing partnerships with teams including LGD Gaming, Talon Esports, Team Vitality, Team New Age, and Tundra Esports. Across all divisions, PSG Esports has won 32 titles, including championships in Dota 2, League of Legends, EA Sports FC, Brawl Stars, Rocket League, and Rainbow Six Siege.

Through its partnership with LGD Gaming, PSG competed in Dota 2 under the PSG.LGD name from 2018 to 2023, winning several international titles and recording three top-three finishes at The International, the game's annual world championship. PSG Esports also won the Brawl Stars World Finals in 2020 and two DreamHack tournaments in Rocket League.

In EA Sports FC, PSG Esports has won several titles and featured players including DaXe, Agge, Rafifa13, Fiddle, and Maniika. Its League of Legends division, operated through the PSG Talon partnership, won multiple Pacific Championship Series titles before the partnership ended in 2025. In Rainbow Six Siege, PSG Talon won Stage 1 of the 2024 South Korea League.

== Organization ==
=== PSG Studio ===
PSG Esports is headquartered at the PSG Studio, which also serves as the training centre for its professional teams. The 140 m² facility, dedicated to sports and digital activities, is located in Boulogne-Billancourt within the headquarters of parent club Paris Saint-Germain FC. Announced in December 2020, the studio opened in the first half of 2021. The Gaming area hosts training sessions and competitions for PSG's professional teams and the Paris Saint-Germain Academy Esports, as well as serving as a recording studio for digital content production. The PSG Studio has a capacity of 19 people and is equipped with six PlayStation 5 consoles, five Nintendo Switch consoles, and five gaming PCs.

=== Academy ===
The Paris Saint-Germain Academy Esports is the youth development system of PSG Esports. Located at the PSG Studio in Boulogne-Billancourt, it was launched in December 2020. The academy provides esports training through courses and coaching sessions across various video games and platforms, including PC and consoles, under the guidance of professional coaches. The PSG Studio hosts participants of different ages and nationalities and offers programmes ranging from recreational activities to competitive esports training.

== Current divisions ==
=== EA Sports FC ===
Founded in October 2016, PSG Esports established its EA Sports FC (formerly FIFA) division the same month. Since its inception, the team has won six titles and has featured players including DaXe, Agge, Rafifa13, Fiddle, and Maniika. DaXe won the team's first trophies by claiming the Esports World Convention championships in 2016 and 2017. Agge won the Legia Esports Cup and a DreamHack title in 2016, while Fiddle won the Gfinity FIFA 18 US Spring Cup in 2018.

In September 2025, PSG Esports entered a two-season partnership with Team Vitality, beginning with the 2025–26 season. The resulting PSG.Vitality roster consisted of Ilian Bouchi and Brice Masson, coached by ManiiKa, who had previously represented PSG in FIFA competitions between 2017 and 2022. In May 2026, Masson won the 2026 eCoupe de France, securing the partnership's first title. He progressed through the group stage with three wins from three matches before defeating Fouma (Lorient) in the round of 16, teammate Ilian Bouchi in the quarter-finals, former PSG Esports player Yaskow (Clermont) in the semi-finals, and Levi de Weerd (Troyes) in the final.

Ahead of the 2026–27 season, PSG.Vitality announced a new roster featuring Levi de Weerd and Lucio "HHezerS" Vecchione. ManiiKa renewed his collaboration with PSG.Vitality for another season, continuing as the section's head coach.

PSG Esports EA Sports FC roster
Players
Coaches

Handle	Name	Nationality
Levi de Weerd	Levi de Weerd	Netherlands
HHezerS	Lucio Vecchione	Italy

Head coach

Johann "ManiiKa" Simon

Legend:
- (I) Inactive
- (S) Suspended
- Substitute
- (injured) Injury / Illness

Roster updated 24 September 2026.

== Former divisions ==
=== League of Legends ===
After acquiring Team Huma's League of Legends (LoL) licence in October 2016, PSG Esports entered the 2017 League of Legends Challenger Series (EU CS) with the aim of qualifying for the League of Legends EMEA Championship (LEC), Europe's top LoL competition. The team's inaugural roster, announced in December 2016, consisted of Steve, Blanc, Kirei, Sprattel, and Pilot. Duke was appointed head coach in February 2017. Following two unsuccessful attempts to qualify for the LEC through the EU CS, PSG withdrew from LoL in October 2017, citing concerns over Riot Games' revenue-sharing model.

PSG returned to LoL in June 2020 through a multi-year partnership with the Hong Kong-based esports organisation Talon Esports, forming PSG Talon. The team competed in the Pacific Championship Series (PCS), winning multiple league titles during the partnership. In January 2025, PSG and Talon ended their partnership. The organisations resumed their partnership in July 2025. In November 2025, Talon's LoL team was removed from the League of Legends Championship Pacific (LCP) after the organisation failed to resolve financial issues that resulted in unpaid salaries for players and staff, bringing the partnership to an end once again.

=== Rocket League ===
PSG Esports entered Rocket League in September 2017 after signing Ferra, Bluey, and Chausette45. The team won its first title at DreamHack Leipzig in February 2018. Following Bluey's departure in August 2018, Fruity joined the lineup as his replacement, and the team retained the title at DreamHack Valencia in July 2019. In August 2019, PSG announced that it had parted ways with its Rocket League roster, which had been regarded as one of the strongest teams in the world at the time.

PSG returned to Rocket League in May 2023 through a partnership with the British esports organisation Tundra Esports, forming PSG.Tundra. The team competed in the Spring Split of the Rocket League Championship Series (RLCS) with a roster consisting of Catalysm, ivn., Sabri, and Tox. PSG.Tundra recorded two top-eight finishes during its time in the RLCS but did not win a title. In December 2023, after seven months of competition, PSG.Tundra announced its withdrawal from Rocket League and confirmed that it would not field a team for the 2024 season.

=== Dota 2 ===
PSG.LGD was formed in April 2018 through a partnership between PSG and the Chinese esports organisation LGD Gaming. During the partnership, the team won 10 titles, including the Epicenter XL Major and the MDL Changsha Major in 2018, two China Dota2 Professional League titles in 2020, the WePlay AniMajor in 2021, the Riyadh Masters in 2022, and four Dota Pro Circuit titles between 2022 and 2023. PSG.LGD also recorded three top-three finishes at The International (TI), Dota 2's annual world championship tournament, finishing as runners-up in 2018 and 2021 and third in 2019. The team featured several prominent Chinese Dota 2 players, including Ame, Somnus, and fy. In September 2023, LGD Gaming announced the end of its partnership with PSG, after which the team resumed competing under the LGD Gaming name.

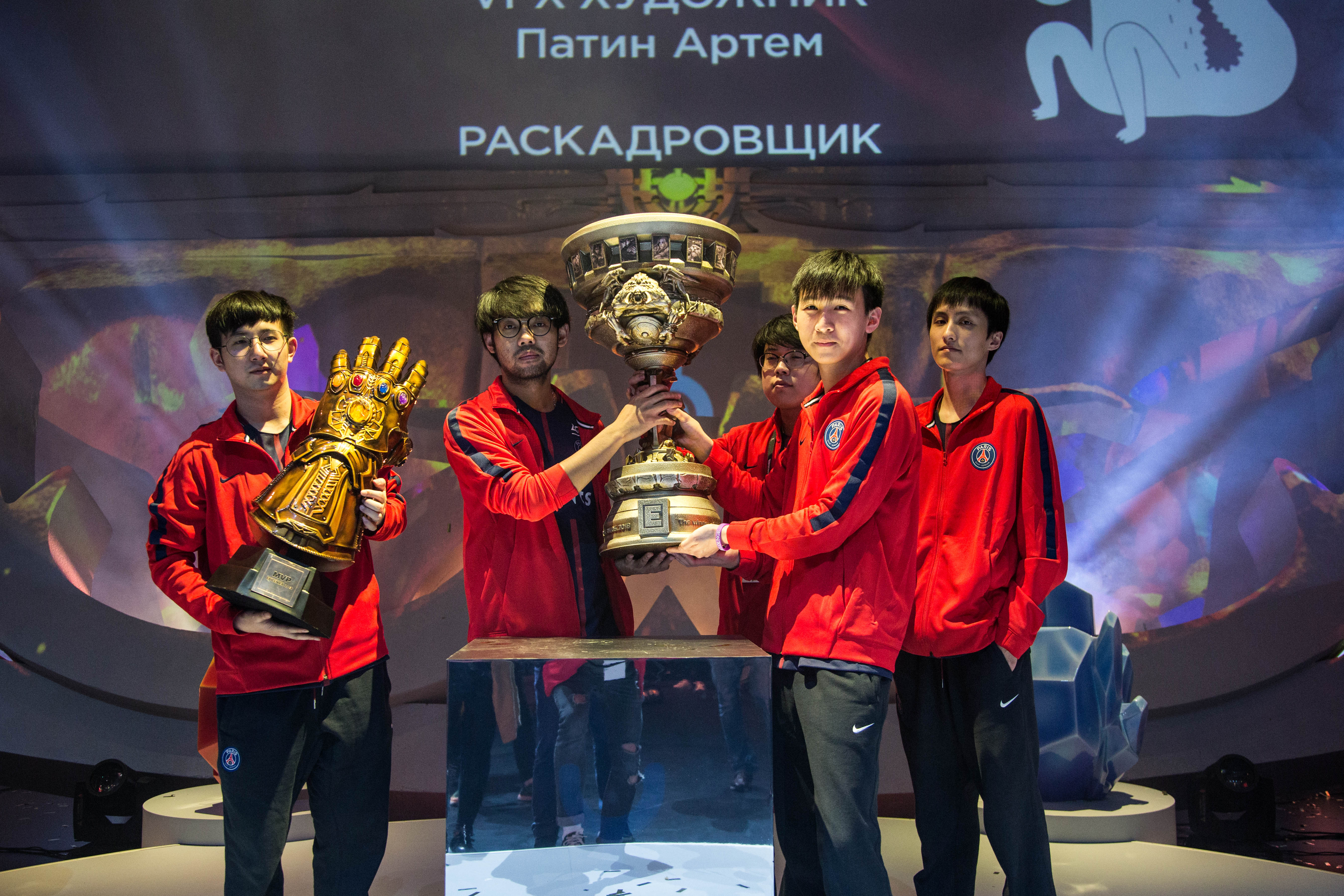
PSG.LGD, the club's Dota 2 team, celebrating its victory at the Epicenter XL Major in 2018.

In October 2023, PSG returned to the Dota 2 scene through a partnership with the Qatar-based esports organisation Quest Esports, with the team competing under the PSG.Quest name. The roster participated in The International 2023 and remained active throughout the 2024 season, competing in events including Elite League 2024, DreamLeague Season 23, the 1win Series Summer, and FISSURE Universe Episode 3. Its best result was a fifth-place finish at the Riyadh Masters 2024, while it failed to qualify for The International 2024. In October 2024, PSG.Quest disbanded its roster and suspended its Dota 2 division.

=== FIFA Online ===
PSG Esports and LGD Gaming expanded their PSG.LGD partnership into FIFA Online in October 2018. The team's roster consisted of Ga, MzDragon, Zarate, Yuwenc, Milano, and Maniika, the latter having previously represented PSG's EA Sports FC division before switching to FIFA Online. The division was short-lived. Maniika, Milano, and Yuwenc departed in 2019, while the team's final match was played in November of that year. Ga, MzDragon, and Zarate left in 2020, bringing the division to an end.

=== Brawl Stars ===
PSG Esports entered Brawl Stars in February 2019 with an all-French roster consisting of SunBentley, TwistiTwik, and Tony M, coached by Trapa. Following a roster overhaul, the team fielded a Singaporean lineup comprising Response, CoupDeAce, and Scythe. PSG won the Brawl Stars Championship three times in 2020, claiming the May, June, and October finals. The team also won the Brawl Stars World Finals in November 2020 without dropping a set, defeating Nova Esports and SK Gaming 3–0 before defeating INTZ 3–0 in the final. Response was named the tournament's Most Valuable Player (MVP). PSG won its final title at the 2021 Brawl League Europe before disbanding its Brawl Stars division in May 2021.

=== Mobile Legends: Bang Bang ===
PSG Esports announced a partnership with the Indonesian Mobile Legends: Bang Bang team Rex Regum Qeon (RRQ) in February 2019. Competing under the PSG.RRQ name, the team became the first Mobile Legends roster to be backed by a traditional sports club. The roster consisted of Lemon, Tuturu, Liam, AyamJAGO, James, and InstincT. The partnership ended in July 2019 after seven months, with PSG citing a desire to focus on other esports titles, particularly Brawl Stars.

=== Arena of Valor ===
PSG Esports launched an Arena of Valor division in July 2021. The team competed in the RoV Pro League, the professional Arena of Valor league in Thailand, and featured an all-Thai roster and coaching staff. In January 2026, PSG Esports disbanded its Arena of Valor division.

=== Fortnite Battle Royale ===
PSG Esports entered into a partnership agreement with Team New Age (TNA) in March 2022 to form PSG.TNA's Fortnite Battle Royale division. The team competed primarily on the North America East server of the Fortnite Championship Series (FNCS). The roster consisted of six players from the Americas and Oceania and was based at a dedicated gaming house in Washington. In June 2023, after one season of competition, PSG.TNA withdrew from competitive Fortnite, citing economic challenges within esports and difficulties in making the division financially sustainable. The roster members became free agents, including Muz, a three-time FNCS winner, as well as Yumi and Kewl, who won FNCS Chapter 3 Season 3 in the NA West region. Blake, Jayth, and OliverOG were also among the players who departed the organisation.

=== Tom Clancy's Rainbow Six Siege ===
PSG Esports partnered with Talon Esports to form the PSG Talon team on Tom Clancy's Rainbow Six Siege in March 2024. Based in South Korea, the team competed in the South Korea League. In its inaugural season, PSG Talon won Stage 1 of the 2024 South Korea League and qualified for the 2024 Esports World Cup and the 2025 Six Invitational. In November 2025, PSG Talon disbanded its Rainbow Six Siege division following financial difficulties.

== Honours ==
As of eCoupe de France 2026.

Video game	Competition	Titles	Seasons
Dota 2	Dota Pro Circuit	4	2022 Tour 1, 2022 Tour 2, 2023 Tour 1, 2023 Tour 3
Dota 2	China Dota2 Professional League	2	2020 Season 1, 2020 Season 2
Dota 2	Riyadh Masters	1	2022
Dota 2	WePlay AniMajor	1	2021
Dota 2	Epicenter XL Major	1	2018
Dota 2	MDL Changsha Major	1	2018
League of Legends	Pacific Championship Series	7	2021 Summer, 2021 Spring, 2022 Spring, 2023 Summer, 2023 Spring, 2024 Summer, 2024 Spring
EA Sports FC	Esports World Convention	2	2016, 2017
EA Sports FC	Ultimate Team Championship Series	1	2017 Season 1 Americas
EA Sports FC	Legia Esports Cup	1	2016
EA Sports FC	DreamHack	1	2016 Winter
EA Sports FC	Gfinity FIFA 18 US Spring Cup	1	2018 Xbox One
EA Sports FC	eCoupe de France	1	2026
Brawl Stars	Brawl Stars Championship	3	2020 May, 2020 June, 2020 October
Brawl Stars	Brawl Stars World Finals	1	2020
Brawl Stars	Brawl League Europe	1	2021 Season 1
Rocket League	DreamHack	2	2018 Leipzig, 2019 Valencia
Tom Clancy's Rainbow Six Siege	South Korea League	1	2024 Stage 1
