= Maple (gamer) =

Taiwanese professional League of Legends player

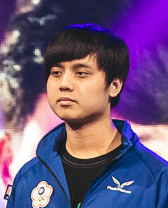
- Huang in 2015

Personal information
- Name: 黃熠棠 (Huang Yi-tang)
- Born: October 10, 1997 (age 29); Taoyuan, Taiwan
- Nationality: Taiwanese

Career information
- Games: League of Legends
- Playing career: 2013–present
- Role: Mid Laner

Team history
- 2013: Gamania Bears
- 2013–2018: Flash Wolves
- 2018–2019: Suning
- 2019–2020: LNG Esports
- 2020–2021: PSG Talon
- 2021–2022: Anyone's Legend
- 2022–2023: Team SoloMid
- 2023–2024: PSG Talon
- 2025–present: PSG Talon
Medal record
Esports
Representing Chinese Taipei
Asian Games
Bronze medal – third place	2018 Jakarta–Palembang	League of Legends

Huang Yi-tang (Chinese: 黃熠棠; pinyin: Huáng Yìtáng; Pe̍h-ōe-jī: N̂g Ia̍h-tông), better known as Maple, is a Taiwanese professional League of Legends player, currently playing as a mid-laner for PSG Talon in the League of Legends Championship Pacific (LCP).

Huang found success domestically and internationally during his time as a member of the Flash Wolves, winning several LMS titles and topping many international events. He has long been considered by many analysts and other professional players as one of the most mechanically skillful players from Taiwan. Huang also played for LPL teams Suning and LNG Esports. He also represented the Chinese Taipei national team at the 2018 Asian Games, earning a bronze medal.

== Career ==
Due to their first-place finish at IEM Taipei, yoe Flash Wolves were invited to compete at the IEM Season IX - World Championship. After a Round 1 loss against SK Gaming, Maple and the team went on to beat Cloud9 in Round 1 of the losers bracket. Round 2 of the losers bracket saw the team's 2nd meeting of the tournament with SK Gaming. A win against the European team secured the yoe Flash Wolves a place in the bracket stage. They were eventually knocked out of the tournament in the semifinals after losing to Team SoloMid.

With a second and third place LMS finish under their belt, the Flash Wolves had obtained a tie for the most LMS Championship Points behind AHQ, and were invited to the 2015 Taiwan Regional Finals. There, FW avenged their playoff loss by defeating Hong Kong Esports 3-2 and acquiring a spot in the 2015 Season World Championship.

At the World Championship, the FW were expected by many analysts to have one of the weakest showings of any team in attendance. However, after a 4-2 group stage with wins over favorites KOO Tigers and Counter Logic Gaming, the Flash Wolves emerged first from groups, becoming the first team in two years to finish ahead of a Korean team in groups at Worlds. In the tournament quarterfinals, FW lost 1–3 to Origen, earning a top eight finish.

Maple was one of the top players at the 2016 Mid-Season Invitational, in which Flash Wolves eventually finished third/fourth after losing to Counter Logic Gaming in the semi-finals.

Following a one-year spell with PSG Talon and a single split on Anyone's Legend, Maple signed with Team SoloMid as their new mid laner. The team finished 5-6th in playoffs following a chaotic split which saw the team make several changes during the season.

Maple would return to PSG Talon after a disastrous 2023 Spring split with TSM, immediately winning the PCS Summer split title in a close series against CTBC Flying Oyster. The midlaner would then win both Spring and Summer PCS splits in 2024, beating LJL side SoftBank Hawks to win the title on both occasions. On 21 November 2024, Maple would retire from competitive League of Legends. On 15 July 2025, Maple would unretire and sign with PSG Talon once again in the League of Legends Championship Pacific (LCP).

== Tournament results ==
=== PSG Talon ===
- 2021 PCS Summer Split — 1st
- 2021 Mid-Season Invitational — 3rd-4th
- 2021 PCS Spring Split — 1st
- 2023 PCS Summer Split — 1st
- 2024 PCS Spring Split — 1st
- 2024 PCS Summer Split — 1st

=== Flash Wolves ===
- 2015 Intel Extreme Masters Season 9 Taipei — 1st
- 2015 League of Legends World Championship — 5th–8th
- 2016 Spring LMS — 1st
- 2016 Mid-Season Invitational — 3rd–4th
- 2016 Summer LMS — 1st
- 2017 Intel Extreme Masters Season 11 World Championship Katowice — 1st
- 2017 Spring LMS — 1st
- 2017 Summer LMS — 1st
