= Frank Esports =

Hong Kong League of Legends team

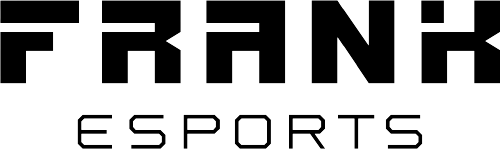
- Short name: FAK
- Game: League of Legends
- Founded: 27 January 2022
- League: Pacific Championship Series
- Based in: Hong Kong
- Head coach: Wong Chun-him
- Manager: Chan Cheuk-kit
- General manager: Tang Ho-lai
- Motto: "Anyone can be frank"

Frank Esports is a Hong Kong professional League of Legends team competing in the Pacific Championship Series (PCS).

== History ==
Frank Esports was founded on 27 January 2022, when its owners acquired a spot in the Pacific Championship Series. It fielded an all-Hongkonger roster in its inaugural season: top laner Tsang "Kirt" Ka-kit, jungler Tsang "Holo" Tak-lam, mid laner Jason "Pretender" Ng Cheuk-lun, bot laner Wong "MnM" Ka-chun, and supports Law "Keres" Chi-kit and Fu "Rebirth" Chun-kit. Pretender was loaned to Frank Esports by fellow Hong Kong team PSG Talon shortly after he joined the latter.

== Current roster ==
Frank Esports roster
Players
Coaches

Role	Handle	Name	Nationality
Top	YSKM	Chau, Shu-tak	Hong Kong
Jungle	Gemini	Huang, Chu-xuan	Taiwan
Mid	Pretender	Ng, Jason Cheuk-lun	Hong Kong
Bot	Shunn	Chao, Ying-shun	Taiwan
Support	MnM	Wong, Ka-chun	Hong Kong

Head coach

Wong "Skywalk" Chun-him

Legend:
- (I) Inactive
- (S) Suspended
- Substitute
- (injured) Injury / Illness

Roster updated 14 March 2025.
