= 2021 League of Legends World Championship =

11th competition of the League of Legends World Championship

Tournament information
- Game: League of Legends
- Location: Iceland
- Dates: October 5–November 6
- Administrator: Riot Games
- Tournament format(s): 10 team single round-robin play-in stage 16 team double round-robin group stage 8 team single-elimination bracket
- Venue: Laugardalshöll (Reykjavík)
- Teams: 22

Final positions
- Champion: Edward Gaming
- Runner-up: DWG KIA

Tournament statistics
- Attendance: Peak viewership: 73,860,742
- MVP: Lee "Scout" Ye-chan (Edward Gaming)

The 2021 League of Legends World Championship was an esports tournament for the multiplayer online battle arena video game League of Legends. It was the eleventh iteration of the League of Legends World Championship, an annual international tournament organized by the game's developer, Riot Games. The tournament was held from 5 October to 6 November in Reykjavík, Iceland. Twenty-two teams from 11 regions qualified for the tournament based on their placement in regional circuits such as those in China, Europe, North America, South Korea and Taiwan/Hong Kong/Macau/Southeast Asia with ten of those teams having to reach the main event via a play-in stage.

"Burn It All Down" was the tournament's theme song, put together by PVRIS, while Denzel Curry, CIFIKA, Besomorph, and Wang Yibo from Uniq, produced their own respective remix versions of "Burn It All Down".

The final took place on 6 November 2021 at the Laugardalshöll, where Edward Gaming of China's League of Legends Pro League (LPL) defeated the defending world champions DWG KIA of Korea's League of Legends Champions Korea (LCK) with a 3–2 scoreline, winning their first World Championship title. Their win marked the third time in four years that a team from China won the event, and they were first Chinese team to win the event since FunPlus Phoenix in 2019.

== Impact of coronavirus on the tournament ==
The COVID-19 pandemic, which was mainly confined to China in January and early February 2020, once again affected the scheduled multi-city hosting format that was most recently present for the 2019 League of Legends World Championship. On June 16, Riot Games originally announced the dates and locations of the event, with the event taking place in Shanghai, Qingdao, Wuhan, Chengdu, and the finals taking place in Shenzhen. However, due to travel complications arising from the COVID-19 pandemic in mainland China, Riot Games announced Reykjavík, Iceland (where the 2021 Mid-Season Invitational had been hosted), as the new host city for the event.

Due to complications arising from the COVID-19 pandemic in Vietnam, two teams from the VCS (Vietnam) were once again unable to participate in the tournament.

Like the 2020 event, the tournament did not feature a live audience as result of the pandemic.

== Qualified teams ==
South Korea (LCK) and China (LPL) received an additional spot in the group stage, totaling up to four representatives each for their respective region. The qualification format for North America (LCS) changed to a one-season-per-year system, with the seeding decided by the cumulative scoreboard from the whole season and the results from their respective championship series.

Due to Vietnam (VCS) being unable to field teams for the event, the third seed from Europe (LEC) received direct entry into the group stage.

Top 4 regions in 2021 Mid-Season Invitational (LPL, LCK, LEC, PCS) are seeded to pool 1 in the main event's group stage for the summer champion.

| Region | League | Qualification Path | Team | ID | Pool |
Started from Group stage
| China | LPL | Summer Champion | Edward Gaming | EDG | 1 |
| China | LPL | Most Championship Points | FunPlus Phoenix | FPX | 2 |
| China | LPL | Regional Finals Winner | Royal Never Give Up | RNG | 3 |
| Europe | LEC | Summer Champion | MAD Lions | MAD | 1 |
| Europe | LEC | Summer Runner-Up | Fnatic | FNC | 2 |
| Europe | LEC | Summer Third Place | Rogue | RGE | 3 |
| South Korea | LCK | Summer Champion | DWG KIA | DK | 1 |
| South Korea | LCK | Most Championship Points | Gen.G | GEN | 2 |
| South Korea | LCK | Regional Finals Winner | T1 | T1 | 3 |
| North America | LCS | Summer Champion | 100 Thieves | 100 | 2 |
| North America | LCS | Summer Runner-Up | Team Liquid | TL | 3 |
| TW/HK/MO/SEA | PCS | Summer Champion | PSG Talon | PSG | 1 |
Started from Play-in stage
| China | LPL | Regional Finals Runner-Up | LNG Esports | LNG | 1 |
| South Korea | LCK | Regional Finals Runner-Up | Hanwha Life Esports | HLE | 1 |
| North America | LCS | Summer Third Place | Cloud9 | C9 | 1 |
| TW/HK/MO/SEA | PCS | Summer Runner-Up | Beyond Gaming | BYG | 1 |
| CIS | LCL | Summer Champion | Unicorns of Love | UOL | 2 |
| Latin America | LLA | Summer Champion | Infinity Esports | INF | 2 |
| Turkey | TCL | Summer Champion | Galatasaray Esports | GS | 2 |
| Brazil | CBLOL | Summer Champion | RED Canids | RED | 2 |
| Japan | LJL | Summer Champion | DetonatioN FocusMe | DFM | 2 |
| Oceania | LCO | Summer Champion | PEACE | PCE | 2 |

== Venue ==
Reykjavík was the city chosen to host the competition. All matches were played at Laugardalshöll without spectators.

Reykjavík, Iceland
Laugardalshöll

== Play-in stage ==
=== Play-in groups ===
- Date and time: October 5–7, began at 11:00 UTC.
- Ten teams are drawn into two groups, with five teams in each group.
- Single round robin, all matches are best-of-one.
- If teams have same win–loss record at the end of play-in groups, tie-breaker matches are played. A two-way tie is not broken by the results of the head-to-head game those teams played, however the team that won in the head-to-head gets side selection in the tiebreaker game.
- The top team automatically qualifies for the Main Event, while 2nd to 4th-place of each group advance to the play-in knockouts and 2nd-place receive a bye to match 2. The bottom team is eliminated.

==== Group A ====
| Pos | Team | Pld | W | L | PCT | Qualification |
|---|---|---|---|---|---|---|
| 1 | LNG Esports | 4 | 4 | 0 | 1.000 | Advance to group stage |
| 2 | Hanwha Life Esports | 4 | 3 | 1 | .750 | Advance to play-in knockouts round 2 |
| 3 | PEACE | 4 | 2 | 2 | .500 | Advance to play-in knockouts round 1 |
| 4 | RED Canids | 4 | 1 | 3 | .250 | Advance to play-in knockouts round 1 |
| 5 | Infinity Esports | 4 | 0 | 4 | .000 | |

Source: LoL Esports
Rules for classification: 1) Winning percentage; 2) Tiebreaker match(es); 3) Total game victory time (Note: The total amount of time it took a team to win their games against all other teams in the tiebreaker)

==== Group B ====
| Pos | Team | Pld | W | L | PCT | Qualification |
|---|---|---|---|---|---|---|
| 1 | DetonatioN FocusMe | 5 | 4 | 1 | .800 | Advance to group stage |
| 2 | Cloud9 | 5 | 3 | 2 | .600 | Advance to play-in knockouts round 2 |
| 3 | Galatasaray Esports | 4 | 2 | 2 | .500 | Advance to play-in knockouts round 1 |
| 4 | Beyond Gaming | 5 | 2 | 3 | .400 | Advance to play-in knockouts round 1 |
| 5 | Unicorns of Love | 5 | 1 | 4 | .200 | |

Source: LoL Esports
Rules for classification: 1) Winning percentage; 2) Tiebreaker match(es); 3) Total game victory time

=== Play-in knockouts ===
- Date and time: October 8–9
- King of the hill format with two branch. The 3rd-place teams from the group stage facing 4th-place teams from the same group in match 1. Winner will play against with the 2nd-place team from other group in match 2.
- Single-elimination. All matches are best-of-five.
- The upper-place team chooses the side for all odd-numbered games, while the lower-place team chooses the side of even-numbered games.
- The winners of the match 2 in each branch advances to the main event group stage.

Round 1
B3 | Galatasaray Esports | 2
B4 | Beyond Gaming | 3
A3 | PEACE | 3
A4 | RED Canids | 2

Round 2
A2 | Hanwha Life Esports | 3
B4 | Beyond Gaming | 0
B2 | Cloud9 | 3
A3 | PEACE | 0

Source: LoL Esports

== Group stage ==
- Date and time: October 11–18, began at 11:00 UTC.
- Sixteen teams are drawn into four groups with four teams in each group based on their seeding. Teams of the same region cannot be placed in the same group.
- Double round robin, all matches are best-of-one.
- If teams have the same win–loss record and head-to-head record, tiebreaker matches are played for first or second place. If more than 2 teams, tiebreaker placement is based on the combined times of teams' victorious games.
- Top two teams will advance to Knockout Stage. Bottom two teams are eliminated.

=== Group A ===
| Pos | Team | Pld | W | L | PCT | Qualification |
|---|---|---|---|---|---|---|
| 1 | DWG KIA | 6 | 6 | 0 | 1.000 | Advance to knockouts |
| 2 | Cloud9 | 7 | 3 | 4 | .429 | Advance to knockouts |
| 3 | Rogue | 8 | 3 | 5 | .375 | |
| 4 | FunPlus Phoenix | 7 | 2 | 5 | .286 | |

Source: LoL Esports
Rules for classification: 1) Winning percentage; 2) Tiebreaker match(es); 3) Total game victory time

=== Group B ===
| Pos | Team | Pld | W | L | PCT | Qualification |
|---|---|---|---|---|---|---|
| 1 | T1 | 6 | 5 | 1 | .833 | Advance to knockouts |
| 2 | Edward Gaming | 6 | 4 | 2 | .667 | Advance to knockouts |
| 3 | 100 Thieves | 6 | 3 | 3 | .500 | |
| 4 | DetonatioN FocusMe | 6 | 0 | 6 | .000 | |

Source: LoL Esports
Rules for classification: 1) Winning percentage; 2) Tiebreaker match(es); 3) Total game victory time

=== Group C ===
| Pos | Team | Pld | W | L | PCT | Qualification |
|---|---|---|---|---|---|---|
| 1 | Royal Never Give Up | 7 | 5 | 2 | .714 | Advance to knockouts |
| 2 | Hanwha Life Esports | 7 | 4 | 3 | .571 | Advance to knockouts |
| 3 | PSG Talon | 6 | 3 | 3 | .500 | |
| 4 | Fnatic | 6 | 1 | 5 | .167 | |

Source: LoL Esports
Rules for classification: 1) Winning percentage; 2) Tiebreaker match(es); 3) Total game victory time

=== Group D ===
| Pos | Team | Pld | W | L | PCT | Qualification |
|---|---|---|---|---|---|---|
| 1 | Gen.G | 8 | 5 | 3 | .625 | Advance to knockouts |
| 2 | MAD Lions | 8 | 4 | 4 | .500 | Advance to knockouts |
| 3 | LNG Esports | 7 | 3 | 4 | .429 | |
| 4 | Team Liquid | 7 | 3 | 4 | .429 | |

Source: LoL Esports
Rules for classification: 1) Winning percentage; 2) Tiebreaker match(es); 3) Total game victory time

== Knockout stage ==
- Date and time: 22 October–6 November, time for all matches 12:00 UTC.
- Eight teams are drawn into a single elimination bracket.
- All matches are best-of-five.
- The first-place team of each group is drawn against the second-place team of a different group.
- The first-place team chooses the side for the first games, loser of the previous game chooses the side for the next game.
- Teams from same group will be on opposite sides of the bracket, meaning they cannot play each other until the Finals.

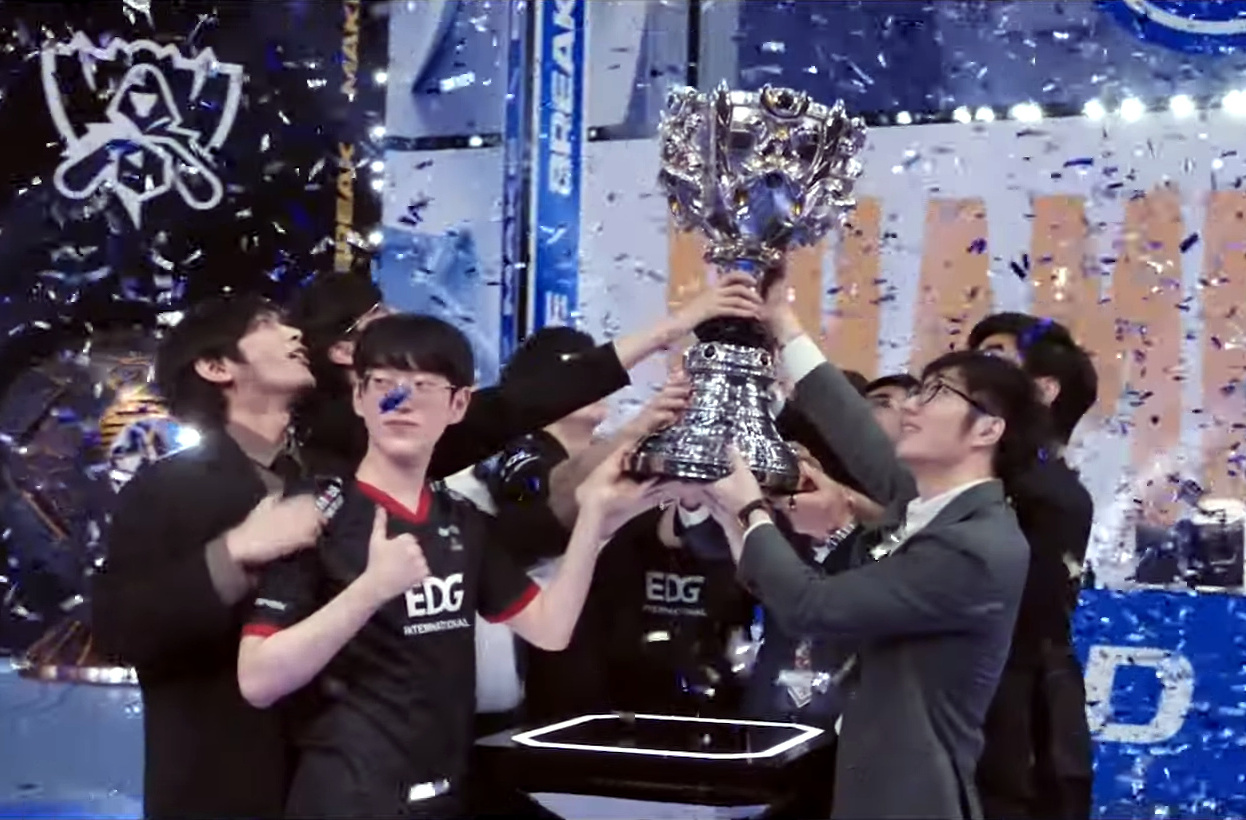
EDG won the 2021 World Championship

Quarterfinals
22 October, 12:00 UTC
C1 | Royal Never Give Up | 2
B2 | Edward Gaming | 3
23 October, 12:00 UTC
D1 | Gen.G | 3
A2 | Cloud9 | 0
24 October, 12:00 UTC
B1 | T1 | 3
C2 | Hanwha Life Esports | 0
25 October, 12:00 UTC
A1 | DWG KIA | 3
D2 | MAD Lions | 0

Semifinals
30 October, 12:00 UTC
Edward Gaming | 3
Gen.G | 2
31 October, 12:00 UTC
T1 | 2
DWG KIA | 3

Final
6 November, 12:00 UTC
Edward Gaming | 3
DWG KIA | 2

== Ranking ==
=== Team ranking ===
| Place | Team | PG | PK1 | PK2 | GS | QF | SF | Finals | Prize (%) | Prize (USD) |
|---|---|---|---|---|---|---|---|---|---|---|
| 1st | Edward Gaming | – | – | – | 4–2 | 3–2 | 3–2 | 3–2 | 22% | $495,000 |
| 2nd | DWG KIA | – | – | – | 6–0 | 3–0 | 3–2 | 2–3 | 15% | $337,500 |
| 3rd–4th | T1 | – | – | – | 5–1 | 3–0 | 2–3 | | 8% | $180,000 |
| 3rd–4th | Gen.G (Note: Not including tie-break games.) | – | – | – | 3–3 | 3–0 | 2–3 | | 8% | $180,000 |
| 5th–8th | Royal Never Give Up | – | – | – | 4–2 | 2–3 | | | 4.5% | $101,250 |
| 5th–8th | Hanwha Life Esports | 3–1 | – | 3–0 | 4–2 | 0–3 | | | 4.5% | $101,250 |
| 5th–8th | MAD Lions | – | – | – | 3–3 | 0–3 | | | 4.5% | $101,250 |
| 5th–8th | Cloud9 | 3–1 | – | 3–0 | 2–4 | 0–3 | | | 4.5% | $101,250 |
| 9th–11th | PSG Talon | – | – | – | 3–3 | | | | 2.5% | $62,500 |
| 9th–11th | 100 Thieves | – | – | – | 3–3 | | | | 2.5% | $62,500 |
| 9th–11th | Rogue | – | – | – | 2–4 | | | | 2.5% | $62,500 |
| 12th–13th | LNG Esports | 4–0 | – | – | 3–3 | | | | 2.375% | $53,347.50 |
| 12th–13th | Team Liquid | – | – | – | 3–3 | | | | 2.375% | $53,347.50 |
| 14th–16th | FunPlus Phoenix | – | – | – | 2–4 | | | | 2.25% | $56,250 |
| 14th–16th | Fnatic | – | – | – | 1–5 | | | | 2.25% | $56,250 |
| 14th–16th | DetonatioN FocusMe | 3–1 | – | – | 0–6 | | | | 2.25% | $56,250 |
| 17th–18th | PEACE | 2–2 | 3–2 | 0–3 | | | | | 1.75% | $43,750 |
| 17th–18th | Beyond Gaming | 1–3 | 3–2 | 0–3 | | | | | 1.75% | $43,750 |
| 19th–20th | Galatasaray Esports | 2–2 | 2–3 | | | | | | 1.25% | $28,125 |
| 19th–20th | RED Canids | 1–3 | 2–3 | | | | | | 1.25% | $28,125 |
| 21st–22nd | Unicorns of Love | 1–3 | | | | | | | 1% | $22,500 |
| 21st–22nd | Infinity Esports | 0–4 | | | | | | | 1% | $22,500 |
| Place | Team | PG | PK1 | PK2 | GS | QF | SF | Finals | Prize (%) | Prize (USD) |
