= PSG Talon =

Professional League of Legends team (2020–2025)

- Short name: PSG
- Game: League of Legends
- Founded: 2020
- Folded: 2025
- League: Pacific Championship Series (2020–2024); League of Legends Championship Pacific (2025)
- Based in: Hong Kong (2020–2022); Taipei (2023–2025)
- Championships: 8× PCS
- Parent group: PSG Esports; Talon Esports

PSG Talon was a professional League of Legends team formed from a partnership between PSG Esports and Talon Esports. It competed in the Pacific Championship Series (PCS) from 2020 to 2024 and then the PCS' successor, the League of Legends Championship Pacific (LCP), for one year in 2025. PSG Talon was the most successful team in the PCS when it was a tier-one league, with eight of the league's ten titles at the time of the PCS' demotion. The team qualified for the World Championship five times, in 2020, 2021, 2023, 2024, and 2025.

== History ==
=== Founding ===
Riot Games announced on 19 December 2019 that Hong Kong organisation Talon Esports would be one of ten teams participating in the newly created Pacific Championship Series. Talon Esports' first player was announced on 1 January, with top laner Su "Hanabi" Chia-hsiang joining from Flash Wolves. During the next few days the rest of the roster was announced: South Korean players Kim "River" Dong-woo and Kim "Candy" Seung-ju joined as the team's jungler and mid laner respectively, whilst the bot lane duo of Wong "Unified" Chun-kit and Ling "Kaiwing" Kai-wing was acquired from Hong Kong Attitude.

=== 2020 season ===
Talon Esports finished third in the spring regular season, qualifying for the first round of playoffs in the winners' bracket. After sweeping Nova Esports in the first round, Talon Esports went on to reverse sweep ahq eSports Club in the second. This qualified them for the semifinals match in the winners' bracket, which they lost to Machi Esports in another close series. This forced Talon Esports to play in the semifinal match in the losers' bracket for another chance at qualifying for the finals, which they did after narrowly defeating ahq once again. Talon Esports managed to win their rematch with Machi Esports in the finals, winning their first title in their inaugural split.

Talon Esports announced on 18 June 2020 that its League of Legends team had partnered with PSG Esports and would henceforth compete as PSG Talon. Mid laner Park "Tank" Dan-won was brought in as a substitute for the summer split, but was later promoted to the starting position after the departure of Candy on 9 July 2020.

In a repeat of the spring split, PSG Talon finished third in the summer regular season, swept Nova Esports in the first round of the winners' bracket, and defeated ahq eSports Club in the second. PSG Talon managed to defeat Machi Esports in a close semifinals rematch, qualifying the team for the summer finals and the 2020 World Championship. PSG Talon later faced Machi Esports once again in a rematch of the spring finals; however, this time Machi Esports swept PSG Talon, forcing PSG Talon to start in the play-in stage of Worlds as the PCS' second seed.

During the 2020 Worlds Group Draw Show, it was revealed that River and Tank would be unable to attend the play-in stage due to delayed visas, and that Hsiao "Kongyue" Jen-tso and Chen "Uniboy" Chang-chu would be loaned from ahq eSports Club to replace them. The organisation confirmed this in an official announcement the next day, and further stated that Unified would also be unable to participate in the first half of the play-in stage for the same reason. Chen "Dee" Chun-dee was loaned from Machi Esports to replace Unified.

Despite starting the play-in stage with three emergency substitutes, PSG Talon won both their games on the first day of competition, including an upset victory over group favourites LGD Gaming. PSG Talon later topped their group after winning a tiebreaker match against the Unicorns of Love, qualifying the team for the tournament's main event. PSG Talon was placed in Group B for the main event, along with South Korea's DAMWON Gaming, China's JD Gaming, and Europe's Rogue. PSG Talon finished third in their group with a 2–4 win–loss record, ending their Worlds run.

PSG Talon announced the departure of Tank on 31 October 2021 and the signing of Huang "Maple" Yi-tang as his replacement on 10 December.

=== 2021 season ===
PSG Talon finished first in the spring regular season, losing only a single game to second-place Beyond Gaming. The team's regular season placement earned them a playoff bye to the second round of the winners' bracket, where they swept J Team. In the semifinals of the winners' bracket, PSG Talon swept Beyond Gaming and qualified for their third consecutive PCS finals. There, PSG Talon swept Beyond Gaming again, winning their second PCS title and qualifying for the 2021 Mid-Season Invitational (MSI 2021).

PSG Talon announced on 25 April 2021 that Unified would not participate in the 2021 Mid-Season Invitational due to recurring cases of pneumothorax. Beyond Gaming's owner, Xue "Dinter" Hong-wei, personally reached out to PSG Talon prior to the announcement and offered to loan out his team's bot laner, Chiu "Doggo" Tzu-chuan, for the duration of the tournament. This temporary transfer was subsequently approved by Riot Games.

For the group stage of MSI 2021, PSG Talon was placed in Group B, along with Europe's MAD Lions, Brazil's paiN Gaming, and Turkey's Istanbul Wildcats. PSG Talon finished second in their group with a 4–2 win–loss record, only losing to first-place MAD Lions, and qualified for the "rumble" stage of the tournament. PSG Talon finished third out of six teams in the rumble stage, advancing to the knockout stage. In the semifinals, China's Royal Never Give Up eliminated PSG Talon from the tournament after a four-game series.

Repeating their successes in the spring split, PSG Talon placed first in the summer regular season, finishing undefeated, and swept J Team in the second round of the winners' bracket. However, PSG Talon's winning streak was ended by Beyond Gaming which, after a close series, knocked PSG Talon down to the semifinals of the losers' bracket. After sweeping J Team once again, PSG Talon qualified for the 2021 World Championship and their fourth consecutive PCS finals, where they defeated Beyond Gaming after another close series.

PSG Talon's first-place finish in the summer split qualified them for the main event of the 2021 World Championship. The team was placed in Group C, along with China's Royal Never Give Up, South Korea's Hanwha Life Esports, and Europe's Fnatic. PSG Talon finished third in their group and failed to qualify for the knockout stage.

River left PSG Talon in November to play for LCS team Dignitas, while Maple left the following month to play for LPL team Anyone's Legend. They were replaced by Lee "Juhan" Ju-han and Park "Bay" Jun-byeong, respectively. Both were acquired from South Korean team Nongshim RedForce Challengers. PSG Talon also signed top laner Huang "Azhi" Shang-chih and mid laner Jason "Pretender" Ng Cheuk-lun as substitute players, although the latter was loaned out to Frank Esports shortly after joining the team.

=== 2022 season ===
PSG Talon finished first in the spring regular season, qualifying them for the second round of the winners' bracket of playoffs. After sweeping newcomers Deep Cross Gaming, PSG Talon advanced to the winners' bracket semifinals, where they lost to CTBC Flying Oyster, which consisted of several ex-Machi and ex-J Team players. PSG Talon managed to defeat J Team after a close series in the losers' bracket semifinals and advanced to their fifth consecutive PCS finals. Avoiding the mistakes of their last series against CTBC Flying Oyster, PSG Talon narrowly won the last game to claim their fourth PCS title and qualify for the 2022 Mid-Season Invitational (MSI 2022).

For the group stage of MSI 2022, PSG Talon was again placed in Group B, along with China's Royal Never Give Up, Brazil's Red Canids, and Turkey's Istanbul Wildcats. PSG Talon finished second in their group with a 3–3 win–loss record and advance to the rumble stage. There, PSG Talon finished fifth out of six teams and were eliminated from the tournament.

Following their disappointing showing at MSI 2022, PSG Talon announced on 1 June 2022 that Juhan and Bay had parted ways with the team. They were replaced by South Korean players Jeong "Burry" Seung-hwan and Kim "Gori" Tae-woo, respectively. Gori had previously played for South Korea's Nongshim RedForce and China's FunPlus Phoenix, and is most well known for his time in the former. Analysts noted that Burry was an unknown rookie at the time of his signing, having only played in South Korea's semi-professional scene.

PSG Talon once again finished first in the summer regular season and qualified for the second round of the winners' bracket of playoffs. After narrowly losing to CTBC Flying Oyster in the second round of the winners' bracket, PSG Talon dropped to the second round of the losers' bracket, where they swept J Team. After a convincing victory over Deep Cross Gaming in the third round, PSG Talon was narrowly eliminated from the summer playoffs by Beyond Gaming in the losers' bracket semifinals. This marked the first time PSG Talon missed a PCS finals and, consequently, a World Championship.

=== 2023 season ===
Prior to the 2023 season, PSG Talon dropped its entire roster from the 2022 summer split and signed a new, all-Taiwanese roster with players from rival top teams. Jungler Huang "Husha" Tzu-wei and bot laner Tsou "Wako" Wei-yang were signed from Beyond Gaming, while mid laner Chen "ubao" Chang-chu (formerly "Uniboy") and support Lin "Woody" Yu-en were signed from J Team and Deep Cross Gaming, respectively. Substitute top laner Huang "Azhi" Shang-chih was also promoted to the starting roster. The team also moved its headquarters from Hong Kong to Taipei, Taiwan.

PSG Talon had a strong start to the spring split, and the team's performance improved even further after they signed Yu "Junjia" Chun-chia, a former jungler of the LPL's Edward Gaming. PSG Talon once again finished first in the spring regular season, qualifying them for the second round of the winners' bracket of playoffs. After narrowly defeating Impunity Esports and CTBC Flying Oyster in the winners' bracket second round and semifinals, respectively, PSG Talon advanced to their sixth PCS finals. There, they faced off against Frank Esports, which included former PSG Talon players Pretender and Kaiwing. PSG Talon swept Frank Esports to claim their fifth PCS title, as well as a spot in the play-in stage of the 2023 Mid-Season Invitational (MSI 2023).

PSG Talon was drawn into group B for the play-in stage of MSI 2023, along with European team G2 Esports, Brazilian team LOUD, and Japanese team DetonatioN FocusMe. PSG Talon swept DetonatioN FocusMe in the first round but were themselves swept by G2 in the second round – a qualifying match for the main event. After sweeping LOUD in the lower bracket, PSG Talon qualified for a last chance qualifying match against North American team Golden Guardians, which they lost. PSG Talon finished ninth overall and were eliminated from the tournament.

PSG Talon did not change their roster going into the summer split; the team once again finished first in the summer regular season and qualified for the second round of the winners' bracket of playoffs. After sweeping Deep Cross Gaming in the winners' bracket second round and narrowly defeating Beyond Gaming in the semifinals, PSG Talon qualified for their seventh PCS finals. PSG Talon once again defeated CTBC Flying Oyster in a close match to claim their sixth PCS title and qualify for their third appearance at the World Championship.

For the play-in stage of the 2023 World Championship, PSG Talon was placed in bracket A and pitted against Latin American team Rainbow7. After sweeping Rainbow7, PSG Talon advanced to the second round of the bracket, where they swept Brazilian team LOUD in a repeat of MSI 2023. PSG Talon consequently advanced to the main event qualifiers as the first seed from bracket A. Despite a strong start to their match against Europe's Team BDS, PSG Talon was ultimately reverse swept by the Europeans in what was only the third reverse sweep in Worlds history.

=== 2024 season ===
For the 2024 season, PSG Talon replaced Wako with veteran player Lu "Betty" Yu-hung in the bot lane. Betty had previously played alongside Maple on LMS team Flash Wolves and LPL team Anyone's Legend.

PSG Talon finished fourth in the first stage of the newly revamped PCS spring regular season, which was a single round robin between all regular season teams. In the second stage, PSG Talon competed in the "contender group", which had the top-four teams compete against each other in a single round robin. The team ultimately finished the regular season in second place, overall. After defeating Beyond Gaming, CTBC Flying Oyster and newcomers from the League of Legends Japan League Fukuoka SoftBank Hawks Gaming, PSG Talon secured their seventh title and a spot at the 2024 Mid-Season Invitational.

PSG Talon's subsequent victory in the 2024 PCS summer split, which was their eighth PCS title, earned them a guest spot in the PCS' successor, the League of Legends Championship Pacific (LCP), but they were announced as a fully-partnered team on 3 November 2024.

=== 2025 season ===
On 5 January 2025, PSG Esports ended their partnership with Talon Esports in League of Legends, with Talon Esports retaining the LCP slot. However, on 15 July 2025, PSG Esports and Talon Esports announced they had renewed their partnership in League of Legends, and the team would rebrand back to PSG Talon. The team would also re-sign Huang "Maple" Yi-tang after he had previously announced his retirement at the conclusion of the 2024 season.

PSG Talon was removed from the LCP for financial insecurity and failing to pay its players and coaches in a timely manner.

== Tournament results ==
| Placement | Event | Final result (W–L) |
|---|---|---|
| 3rd | 2020 PCS Spring Regular Season | 13–5 |
| 1st | 2020 PCS Spring Playoffs | 3–2 (against Machi Esports) |
| 3rd | 2020 PCS Summer Regular Season | 14–4 |
| 2nd | 2020 PCS Summer Playoffs | 0–3 (against Machi Esports) |
| 9th–12th | 2020 World Championship | 2–4 (main event group stage) |
| 1st | 2021 PCS Spring Regular Season | 17–1 |
| 1st | 2021 PCS Spring Playoffs | 3–0 (against Beyond Gaming) |
| 3rd–4th | 2021 Mid-Season Invitational | 1–3 (against Royal Never Give Up) |
| 1st | 2021 PCS Summer Regular Season | 18–0 |
| 1st | 2021 PCS Summer Playoffs | 3–2 (against Beyond Gaming) |
| 9th–12th | 2021 World Championship | 3–3 (main event group stage) |
| 1st | 2022 PCS Spring Regular Season | 16–2 |
| 1st | 2022 PCS Spring Playoffs | 3–2 (against CTBC Flying Oyster) |
| 5th–6th | 2022 Mid-Season Invitational | 3–7 (main event group stage) |
| 1st | 2022 PCS Summer Regular Season | 14–4 |
| 3rd | 2022 PCS Summer Playoffs | 2–3 (against Beyond Gaming) |
| 1st | 2023 PCS Spring Regular Season | 15–3 |
| 1st | 2023 PCS Spring Playoffs | 3–0 (against Frank Esports) |
| 9th | 2023 Mid-Season Invitational | 0–3 (against Golden Guardians) |
| 1st | 2023 PCS Summer Regular Season | 16–2 |
| 1st | 2023 PCS Summer Playoffs | 3–2 (against CTBC Flying Oyster) |
| 17th–18th | 2023 World Championship | 2–3 (against Team BDS) |
| 2nd | 2024 PCS Spring Regular Season | 7–3 |
| 1st | 2024 PCS Spring Playoffs | 3–0 (against SoftBank Hawks) |
| 7th–8th | 2024 Mid-Season Invitational | 0–3 (against G2 Esports) |
| 2nd | 2024 PCS Summer Regular Season | 9–1 |
| 1st | 2024 PCS Summer Playoffs | 3–1 (against SoftBank Hawks) |
| 12th–14th | 2024 World Championship | 0–2 (against Bilibili Gaming) |
| 1st | 2025 LCP Season Kickoff Regular Season | 6–1 |
| 2nd | 2025 LCP Season Kickoff Playoffs | 2–3 (against CTBC Flying Oyster) |
| 3rd | 2025 LCP Mid-Season Regular Season | 5–2 |
| 3rd | 2025 LCP Mid-Season Playoffs | 1–3 (against GAM Esports) |
