= Esports at the 2023 Pan American Games =

- Venue: National Stadium Sports Park
- Start date: October 21, 2023
- End date: November 4, 2023
- No. of events: 4 (2 men, 2 women)
- Competitors: 120 from 25 nations

Esports competitions at the 2023 Pan American Games in Santiago, Chile, were featured as a demonstration sport, meaning medals won in this sport would not be counted in the official overall medal tally. It was held between October 21 and November 4, 2023, at the National Stadium Sports Park.

Two video games were featured in the demonstration event, Dota 2 and eFootball 2023, it was held at the Pan American Esports Championships, being organized by the Global Esports Federation.

== Participating nations ==
A total of 25 NOC's qualified athletes. The number of athletes a nation entered is in parentheses beside the name of the country.

- Argentina (14)
- Barbados (1)
- Brazil (2)
- Cayman Islands (1)
- Chile (14)
- Colombia (12)
- Costa Rica (6)
- Cuba (12)
- Ecuador (6)
- El Salvador (1)
- Independent Athletes Team (6)
- Guyana (1)
- Peru (12)
- Venezuela (12)

== Medal summary ==
=== Medal table ===
* Host nation (Chile)

Rank	Nation	Gold	Silver	Bronze	Total
1	Peru	2	0	0	2
2	Brazil	1	1	0	2
3	Mexico	1	0	0	1
4	Argentina	0	3	1	4
5	Chile*	0	0	1	1
5	Ecuador	0	0	1	1
5	Paraguay	0	0	1	1
Totals (7 entries)		4	4	4	12

=== Medalists ===
==== Open events ====
Event	Gold	Silver	Bronze
eFootball 2023 tournament	Celic Hernández; Mexico	Claudio Henrique Mesquita; Brazil	Lautaro Federico Raris; Argentina
Dota 2 tournament	Peru	Argentina; Alan Cruz; Fabricio Suárez; Mariano Caneda; Mauricio Avendaño; Nicolás Flores; Nicolás Moreno	Ecuador

==== Women's events ====
Event	Gold	Silver	Bronze
eFootball 2023 tournament	Monik Correa Bisoni; Brazil	María Belén Giunta; Argentina	Verónica Rocio Chavez Girett; Paraguay
Dota 2 tournament	Peru	Argentina; Débora Ponce; Lucía Polanco; Luz Ayala; Milena Evangelista; Romina Pacheco; Victoria Destribats	Chile; Macarena Albornoz; Catalina Anderson; Nicole Ceballos; Javiera González; Vania Mardones; Nataly Troncoso
