= 2023 PCS season =

Sports season

- League: Pacific Championship Series
- Sport: League of Legends
- Duration: 3 February – 9 April (Spring); 30 June – 9 September (Summer)
- Teams: 12

Spring
- Season champions: PSG Talon
- Runners-up: Frank Esports

Summer
- Season champions: PSG Talon
- Runners-up: CTBC Flying Oyster

PCS seasons
- ← 2022 2024 →

The 2023 PCS season was the fourth year of the Pacific Championship Series (PCS), a professional esports league for the MOBA PC game League of Legends. It was the first to include teams from the League of Legends Circuit Oceania.

The spring split began with the start of the regular season on 3 February and concluded with the end of playoffs on 9 April. After a close playoffs overall, PSG Talon swept Frank Esports in the finals to claim their fifth PCS title.

== Spring ==
=== Teams ===
Meta Falcon Team was acquired by Taiwanese streamer Chang "Godtone" Chia-hang, who subsequently founded Hell Pigs. SEM9 partnered with Philippine team West Point Esports to form SEM9 WPE. PSG Talon and Impunity Esports moved their teams to Taipei.

=== Regular season standings ===
- Format: Double round robin, best-of-one

Pos	Team	W	L	Pts	Qualification
1	PSG Talon	15	3	12	Advance to winners' bracket second round
2	Frank Esports	12	6	6 (Note: Frank Esports defeated CTBC Flying Oyster in a tiebreaker match.)	Advance to winners' bracket second round
3	CTBC Flying Oyster	12	6	6	Start in winners' bracket
4	Impunity Esports	11	7	4	Start in winners' bracket
5	Beyond Gaming	10	8	2 (Note: Beyond Gaming defeated Deep Cross Gaming in a tiebreaker match.)	Start in losers' bracket
6	Deep Cross Gaming	10	8	2	Start in losers' bracket
7	J Team	8	10	−2	
8	Hell Pigs	6	12	−6	
9	Dewish Team	3	15	−12 (Note: Dewish Team had the better head-to-head record against SEM9 WPE.)	
10	SEM9 WPE	3	15	−12	

Source: PCS Facebook page

=== Playoffs ===
- Format: Double elimination
- Participants: Top six teams from the PCS regular season and top two teams from the LCO second stage
- Winner qualifies for the 2023 Mid-Season Invitational

Round 1 (BO5)	Round 2 (BO5)	Semifinals (WB, BO5)	Finals (BO5)
1.	PSG Talon	3
4.	Impunity Esports	3	R1	Impunity Esports	2
LCO	Team Bliss	0	R2	PSG Talon	3
R2	CTBC Flying Oyster	2
2.	Frank Esports	2
3.	CTBC Flying Oyster	3	R1	CTBC Flying Oyster	3
LCO	Chiefs Esports Club	0
WB	PSG Talon	3
LB	Frank Esports	0
Round 1 (BO5)	Round 2 (BO5)	Round 3 (BO5)	Semifinals (LB, BO5)
R1	Beyond Gaming	2
5.	Beyond Gaming	3	WB	Impunity Esports	3	R3	Frank Esports	3
WB	Chiefs Esports Club	1	R2	Impunity Esports	0	WB	CTBC Flying Oyster	1
R2	Frank Esports	3
R1	Deep Cross Gaming	2
6.	Deep Cross Gaming	3	WB	Frank Esports	3
WB	Team Bliss	0

=== Ranking ===
Place	Team	Prize (USD)	Prize share	Qualification
1st	PSG Talon	$30,000	33.7%	2023 Mid-Season Invitational
2nd	Frank Esports	$14,000	15.7%	
3rd	CTBC Flying Oyster	$10,000	11.2%	
4th	Impunity Esports	$7,000	7.9%	
5th–6th	Beyond Gaming	$4,500	5.1%	
5th–6th	Deep Cross Gaming	$4,500	5.1%	
7th–8th	Chiefs Esports Club	$3,000	3.4%	
7th–8th	Team Bliss	$3,000	3.4%	
9th	J Team	$3,000	3.4%	
10th	Hell Pigs	$3,000	3.4%	
11th	Dewish Team	$2,000	2.2%	
12th	SEM9 WPE	$2,000	2.2%	

== Summer ==
=== Teams ===
West Point Esports ended their partnership with SEM9 and acquired the spot of SEM9 WPE. Impunity Esports moved their team back to Singapore.

=== Regular season standings ===
- Format: Double round robin, best-of-one

Pos	Team	W	L	Pts	Qualification
1	PSG Talon	16	2	14	Advance to winners' bracket second round
2	J Team	15	3	12	Advance to winners' bracket second round
3	Beyond Gaming	14	4	10	Start in winners' bracket
4	Deep Cross Gaming	10	8	2	Start in winners' bracket
5	CTBC Flying Oyster	9	9	0 (Note: CTBC Flying Oyster defeated Frank Esports in a tiebreaker match.)	Start in losers' bracket
6	Frank Esports	9	9	0	Start in losers' bracket
7	West Point Esports	7	11	−4 (Note: West Point Esports had the better head-to-head record against Hell Pigs.)	
8	Hell Pigs	7	11	−4	
9	Impunity Esports	2	16	−14	Drop to promotion tournament
10	Dewish Team	1	17	−16	Drop to promotion tournament

Source: PCS Facebook page

=== Playoffs ===
- Format: Double elimination
- Participants: Top six teams from the PCS regular season and top two teams for the LCO playoffs
- Winner and runner-up qualify for the 2023 World Championship

Round 1 (BO5)	Round 2 (BO5)	Semifinals (WB, BO5)	Finals (BO5)
1.	PSG Talon	3
4.	Deep Cross Gaming	3	R1	Deep Cross Gaming	0
LCO	Chiefs Esports Club	1	R2	PSG Talon	3
R2	Beyond Gaming	2
2.	J Team	0
3.	Beyond Gaming	3	R1	Beyond Gaming	3
LCO	Team Bliss	0
WB	PSG Talon	3
LB	CTBC Flying Oyster	2
Round 1 (BO5)	Round 2 (BO5)	Round 3 (BO5)	Semifinals (LB, BO5)
R1	CTBC Flying Oyster	3
5.	CTBC Flying Oyster	3	WB	Deep Cross Gaming	1	R3	CTBC Flying Oyster	3
WB	Team Bliss	0	R2	CTBC Flying Oyster	3	WB	Beyond Gaming	2
R2	Frank Esports	2
R1	Frank Esports	3
6.	Frank Esports	3	WB	J Team	0
WB	Chiefs Esports Club	1

=== Ranking ===
Place	Team	Prize (USD)	Prize share	Qualification
1st	PSG Talon	$30,000	33.7%	2023 World Championship
2nd	CTBC Flying Oyster	$14,000	15.7%	2023 World Championship
3rd	Beyond Gaming	$10,000	11.2%	
4th	Frank Esports	$7,000	7.9%	
5th–6th	Deep Cross Gaming	$4,500	5.1%	
5th–6th	J Team	$4,500	5.1%	
7th–8th	Chiefs Esports Club	$3,000	3.4%	
7th–8th	Team Bliss	$3,000	3.4%	
9th	West Point Esports	$3,000	3.4%	
10th	Hell Pigs	$3,000	3.4%	
11th	Impunity Esports	$2,000	2.2%	
12th	Dewish Team	$2,000	2.2%	
