= 2021 Mid-Season Invitational =

League of Legends esports tournament

Tournament information
- Sport: League of Legends
- Location: Reykjavík, Iceland
- Dates: 6 May–23 May
- Administrator: Riot Games
- Venue: Laugardalshöll
- Teams: 11

Final positions
- Champions: Royal Never Give Up
- Runner-up: DWG KIA
- MVP: Chen "GALA" Wei (Royal Never Give Up)

The 2021 Mid-Season Invitational was the sixth Mid-Season Invitational (MSI), a Riot Games-organised tournament for League of Legends, a multiplayer online battle arena video game. The tournament was the culmination of the 2021 Spring Split and the first international competition of Season 11.

Each of the 12 premier League of Legends leagues had a team representing them. This was the first edition in which all competitive regions began in the same stage of the tournament, unlike previous years where the winners of the minor leagues had to win play-in matches to face teams from the larger regions.

"Starts Right Here" was the tournament's theme song, put together by Foreign Air, and Kenny Mason.

The tournament was hosted in Iceland from 6 to 23 May 2021. All of the matches were held in the Laugardalshöll in Reykjavík due to restrictions from the COVID-19 pandemic. In the final, Royal Never Give Up from China defeated the reigning world champion DWG KIA from South Korea 3–2 in the final, winning their second MSI title.

== Format ==
The format for 2021 replaces the play-in stage used from 2017 to 2019 with a group stage featuring all regions. The 12 teams were seeded into 3 groups from 4 seeding pools. This is the first time that teams from Europe (LEC), South Korea (LCK) and China (LPL) will not automatically qualify for the second stage (known as the rumble stage, formerly the group stage of the main event) but have to compete with all remaining teams.

The top two teams in each group in group stage qualify for the rumble stage, a six team double round robin. The top four teams of the rumble stage advance to the single elimination knockout stage.

The winning team earns their region an additional bid to the 2021 League of Legends World Championship.

== Qualified teams ==
The number of regions decreased from 13 at MSI 2019 to 12, due to the merger of Taiwan/Hong Kong/Macau (LMS) and Southeast Asian (LST) professional leagues into the PCS for 2020.

Pools of group stage are determined by the achievements of regions during the MSI and Worlds events from the two years prior.

Region	League	Teams	ID	Pool
China	LPL	Royal Never Give Up	RNG	1
Europe	LEC	MAD Lions	MAD	1
South Korea	LCK	DWG KIA	DK	1
North America	LCS	Cloud9	C9	2
TW/HK/MO/SEA	PCS	PSG Talon	PSG	2
Vietnam	VCS	~~GAM Esports~~ (Note: Due to national travel restrictions related to COVID-19 in Vietnam, GAM Esports was unable to participate.)	GAM	2
CIS	LCL	Unicorns of Love	UOL	3
Latin America	LLA	Infinity Esports	INF	3
Turkey	TCL	Istanbul Wildcats	IW	3
Brazil	CBLOL	paiN Gaming	PNG	4
Japan	LJL	DetonatioN FocusMe	DFM	4
Oceania	LCO	Pentanet.GG	PGG	4

== Venue ==
Reykjavík was the city chosen to host the competition. All matches will be played at Laugardalshöll without spectators.

Reykjavík, Iceland
Laugardalshöll

== Group stage ==
- Date and time: 6–11 May, begins at 13:00 UTC
- Twelve teams are drawn into three groups, with four teams in each group
- Quadruple round robin for group A, double round robin for groups B and C; all matches are best-of-one
- If two teams have the same win–loss record and head-to-head record then a tiebreaker match is played
- Top two teams will advance to the rumble stage; bottom two teams are eliminated

Group A

Pos	Team	Pld	W	L	PCT	Qualification
1	Royal Never Give Up	8	8	0	1.000	Advance to Rumble stage
2	Pentanet.GG	9	3	6	0.333	Advance to Rumble stage
3	Unicorns of Love	9	2	7	0.222	

Source: LoL Esports

Group B

Pos	Team	Pld	W	L	PCT	Qualification
1	MAD Lions	6	5	1	0.833	Advance to Rumble stage
2	PSG Talon	6	4	2	0.667	Advance to Rumble stage
3	paiN Gaming	6	2	4	0.333	
4	İstanbul Wildcats	6	1	5	0.167	

Source: LoL Esports

Group C

Pos	Team	Pld	W	L	PCT	Qualification
1	DWG KIA	6	5	1	0.833	Advance to Rumble stage
2	Cloud9	6	4	2	0.667	Advance to Rumble stage
3	DetonatioN FocusMe	6	2	4	0.333	
4	Infinity Esports	6	1	5	0.167	

Source: LoL Esports

== Rumble stage ==
- Date and time: 14–18 May, begins at 13:00 UTC
- Six teams will play in a double round robin; matches are best-of-one
- If teams have the same win–loss record and head-to-head record, then tiebreaker matches are played for first, second, and fourth place
- Top four teams will advance to the Knockout stage; bottom two teams are eliminated

Pos	Team	Pld	W	L	PCT	Qualification
1	DWG KIA	10	8	2	0.800	Advance to Knockout Stage
2	Royal Never Give Up	10	7	3	0.700	Advance to Knockout Stage
3	PSG Talon	10	6	4	0.600	Advance to Knockout Stage
4	MAD Lions	10	5	5	0.500	Advance to Knockout Stage
5	Cloud9	10	3	7	0.300	
6	Pentanet.GG	10	1	9	0.100	

Source: LoL Esports

== Knockout stage ==
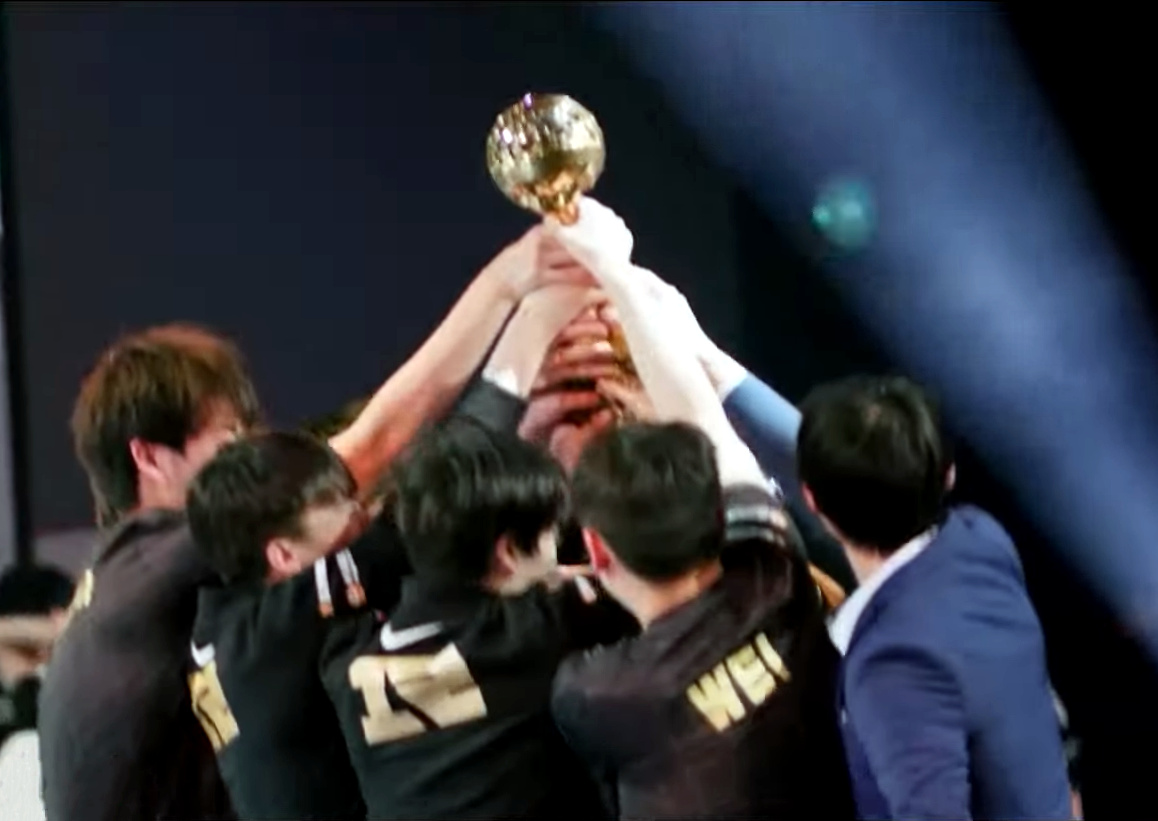
RNG won the 2021 MSI.

- 1st place team from the rumble stage chooses between 3rd and 4th to be their semifinal opponent (DK chose MAD).
- Single elimination, matches are best-of-five

Semifinals
2	Royal Never Give Up	3
3	PSG Talon	1
1	DWG KIA	3
4	MAD Lions	2

Final
Royal Never Give Up	3
DWG KIA	2

Source: LoL Esports

=== Semifinals ===
Semifinals	May 21	Royal Never Give Up	3	–	1	PSG Talon	Reykjavík, Iceland
	13:00 UTC	Source					Laugardalshöll
		1	Game 1			0	
		0	Game 2			1	
		1	Game 3			0	
		1	Game 4			0	

Semifinals	May 22	DWG KIA	3	–	2	MAD Lions	Reykjavík, Iceland
	13:00 UTC	Source					Laugardalshöll
		1	Game 1			0	
		0	Game 2			1	
		0	Game 3			1	
		1	Game 4			0	
		1	Game 5			0	

=== Finals ===
Final	May 23	Royal Never Give Up	3	–	2	DWG KIA	Reykjavík, Iceland
	13:00 UTC	Source					Laugardalshöll
		1	Game 1			0	
		0	Game 2			1	
		1	Game 3			0	
		0	Game 4			1	
		1	Game 5			0	

== Ranking ==
(*) Not including tie-break games.

Place	League	Teams	GS	RS	SF	Final
1st	LPL	Royal Never Give Up	8–0	7–3	3–1	3–2
2nd	LCK	DWG KIA	5–1	8–2	3–2	2–3
3rd–4th	LEC	MAD Lions	5–1	5–5	2–3	
3rd–4th	PCS	PSG Talon	4–2	6–4	1–3	
5th	LCS	Cloud9	4–2	3–7		
6th	LCO	Pentanet.GG*	2–6	1–9		
7th–8th	LJL	DetonatioN FocusMe	2–4			
7th–8th	CBLOL	paiN Gaming	2–4			
9th–11th	LCL	Unicorns of Love*	2–6			
9th–11th	LLA	Infinity Esports	1–5			
9th–11th	TCL	Istanbul Wildcats	1–5			
