= Bob Argo =

American politician

Member of the Georgia House of Representatives
- In office January 10, 1977 – January 12, 1987
- Preceded by: Chappelle Matthews
- Succeeded by: Lawton Stephens
- Constituency: 63rd district (1977–1983); 68th district (1983–1987)

Personal details
- Born: Robert Eugene Argo Jr. November 18, 1923 Atlanta, Georgia, U.S.
- Died: July 7, 2016 (aged 92) Athens, Georgia, U.S.
- Resting place: Oconee Hill Cemetery
- Party: Democratic
- Spouse: Jeane Lois Alderson (m. 1953)
- Children: 3, including Marty
- Education: University of Georgia
- Occupation: Insurance executive

Military service
- Branch/service: United States Coast Guard
- Battles/wars: World War II; Pacific theater

Robert Eugene Argo Jr. (November 18, 1923 – July 7, 2016) was an American politician and insurance executive. An alumnus of the University of Georgia, Argo served in the Civil Air Patrol and later in the United States Coast Guard during World War II. Argo was first elected to the Georgia House of Representatives in 1976, and he served until 1986.

He was the father of Marty Kemp, First Lady of Georgia.
