= Mary Ann Cobb Erwin =

America clubwoman (1850–1930)

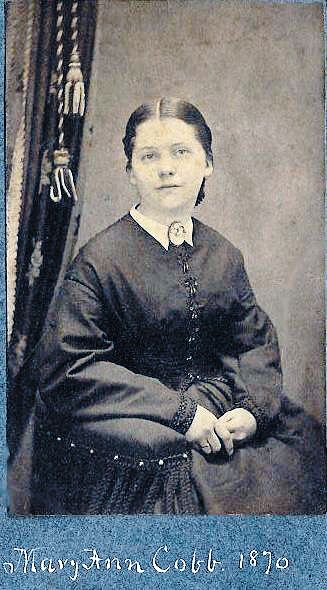
- Erwin in 1870
- Born: Mary Ann Lamar Cobb; February 15, 1850; Clarke County, Georgia, U.S.
- Died: January 16, 1930 (aged 79); Athens, Georgia, U.S.
- Resting place: Oconee Hill Cemetery
- Spouse: Alexander S. Erwin
- Children: 5
- Parents: Howell Cobb (father); Mary Ann Lamar (mother)
- Relatives: Andrew J. Cobb (brother); Mildred Lewis Rutherford (cousin); Thomas R. R. Cobb (uncle); Howell Cobb (grand uncle)

Mary Ann Lamar Cobb Erwin (February 15, 1850 – January 16, 1930) was an American clubwoman who was the orginator of the Southern Cross of Honor, a commemorative medal awarded to Confederate veterans by the United Daughters of the Confederacy.

== Early life and family ==
Erwin was the daughter of the politician and planter Howell Cobb and Mary Ann Lamar. Her mother, the daughter of Colonel Zachariah Lamar, was from a prominent Southern family and was a relative of Texas President Mirabeau B. Lamar and Georgia financier Gazaway Bugg Lamar. Her father, also from a prominent Southern family, served as Governor of Georgia, as a congressman and Speaker of the House, and as Secretary of the Treasury before becoming the President of the Confederate States Provisional Congress. She was a grandniece of Howell Cobb and niece of Thomas R. R. Cobb. She was the sister of Andrew J. Cobb and a cousin of Mildred Lewis Rutherford.

== United Daughters of the Confederacy ==
Erwin was a member of the Laura Rutherford Chapter of the United Daughters of the Confederacy. In 1898, she came up with an idea for a commemorative medal that the organization could award to Confederate States Army and Confederate States Navy veterans which was known as the Southern Cross of Honor. She and Sarah E. Gabbett designed the cross. As a compliment to her efforts in establishing the medal, the inaugural Southern Cross of Honor bestowed by the United Daughters of the Confederacy was awarded to her husband, Judge Alexander S. Erwin of Athens, Georgia, on April 26, 1900.

== Personal life ==
She was married to Alexander S. Erwin, a local juge. They had five children.

Erwin died at her home in Athens on January 16, 1930.
