= Julian H. Cox =

American politician (1906–1978)

Member of the Georgia House of Representatives from Clarke County
- In office January 12, 1959 – January 14, 1963 Serving with Chappelle Matthews
- Preceded by: Robert G. Stephens Jr.
- Succeeded by: Randall Bedgood

Member of the Georgia State Senate from the 50th district
- In office January 14, 1957 – January 12, 1959
- Preceded by: George B. Brooks
- Succeeded by: Sam P. McGill

Personal details
- Born: Julian Hoyt Cox; May 24, 1906 Athens, Georgia, U.S.
- Died: August 13, 1978 (aged 72) Athens, Georgia, U.S.
- Resting place: Oconee Hill Cemetery
- Party: Democratic
- Spouses: Belle Vernon Porter (m. 1932, divorced); Edith Pittman Hutchins (m. 1942)
- Occupation: Businessman; politician

Military service
- Branch/service: United States Army; Army Service Forces; Ordnance Department
- Years of service: 1942–1945
- Rank: Captain
- Battles/wars: World War II; American theater

Julian Hoyt Cox (May 24, 1906 – August 13, 1978) was an American businessman and politician who served in both houses of the Georgia General Assembly: the Georgia State Senate from 1957 to 1959 and the Georgia House of Representatives from 1959 to 1963. He died on August 13, 1978, in Athens, Georgia, and was buried in Oconee Hill Cemetery. His grandson, Brian Kemp, entered politics and served in the state senate, as Georgia Secretary of State, and as Governor of Georgia.
