= Cosmo P. Richardsone =

Scottish physician (1804–1852)

- Born: 24 January 1804; Edinburgh, Scotland
- Died: February 6, 1852 (aged 48); Savannah, Georgia, U.S.
- Resting place: Laurel Grove Cemetery, Savannah, Georgia, U.S.
- Occupation: Physician
- Spouse(s): Margaret Bailey (m. –1838; her death); Elizabeth Bailey (m. 1839–1852; his death)
- Children: 4, including Sarah E. Gabbett

Cosmo P. Richardsone (or Richardson) (24 January 1804 – 6 February 1852) was a 19th-century Scottish physician who became eminent in Savannah, Georgia, United States. He was described as "one of the most brilliant members of the Savannah medical profession for many years."

== Early life ==
Richardsone was born in 1804 in Edinburgh, Scotland. His father, a native of South Carolina, United States, moved his family back there when Richardsone was three years old. In 1819, when Richardsone was 15, the family moved to Georgia.

In education, Richardsone was under the tutelage of Reverend Carlisle Pollock Beman, before studying medicine under Dr William Coffee Daniell in Savannah, Georgia, where he established a practice upon graduating.

== Career ==
In 1844, he Richardsone became captain of the Savannah Volunteer Guards. The Guards presented him with a sword, which was hung in its armory.

== Personal life ==
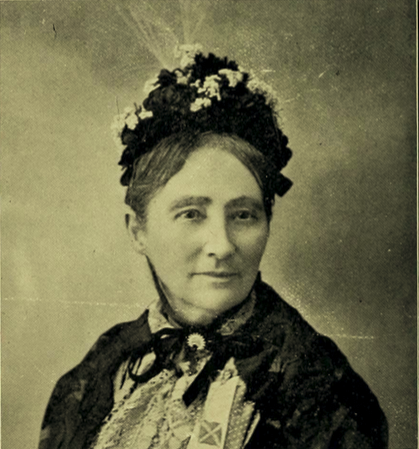
Richardsone's daughter, Sarah, pictured in the early 20th century

Richardsone married twice. His first wife, Margaret Bailey, died of brain fever in 1838. Her sister, Elizabeth, became Richardsone's new wife the following year. He had four known children: one (daughter Sarah) with Margaret and three with Elizabeth (Cosmo Jr, Margaret and Cornelia "Nina"). Sarah married Irishman William Gabbett and became the custodian of the Southern Cross of Honor, which she designed. Cosmo Jr served in the first battle of Fort Sumter, under General P. G. T. Beauregard Margaret became the first wife of noted Augusta physician Dr William Harrison Foster.

Richardsone was a member of the Savannah branch of the Saint Andrew's society.

== Death ==
Richardsone died in 1852, aged 48. He was interred in Savannah's Laurel Grove Cemetery, beneath a marble monument erected by the Savannah Volunteer Guards. His widow was buried beside him upon her death in 1890.
