= Andrew Cobb =

Andrew Cobb may refer to:

- Andrew R. Cobb (1876–1943), Canadian-American architect based in Nova Scotia
- Andrew J. Cobb (1857–1925), justice of the Supreme Court of Georgia
