= Justice Holden =

Justice Holden may refer to:

- Edwin M. Holden (1869–1957), associate justice of the Idaho Supreme Court
- Horace Moore Holden (1866–1936), associate justice of the Supreme Court of Georgia
- James Stuart Holden (1914–1996), associate justice and chief justice of the Vermont Supreme Court
- John Burt Holden (1873–1928), associate justice of the Supreme Court of Mississippi
- Thomas Holden (general) (1741–1823), associate justice of the Rhode Island Supreme Court
