= Robert G. Stephens Jr. =

American politician (1913–2003)

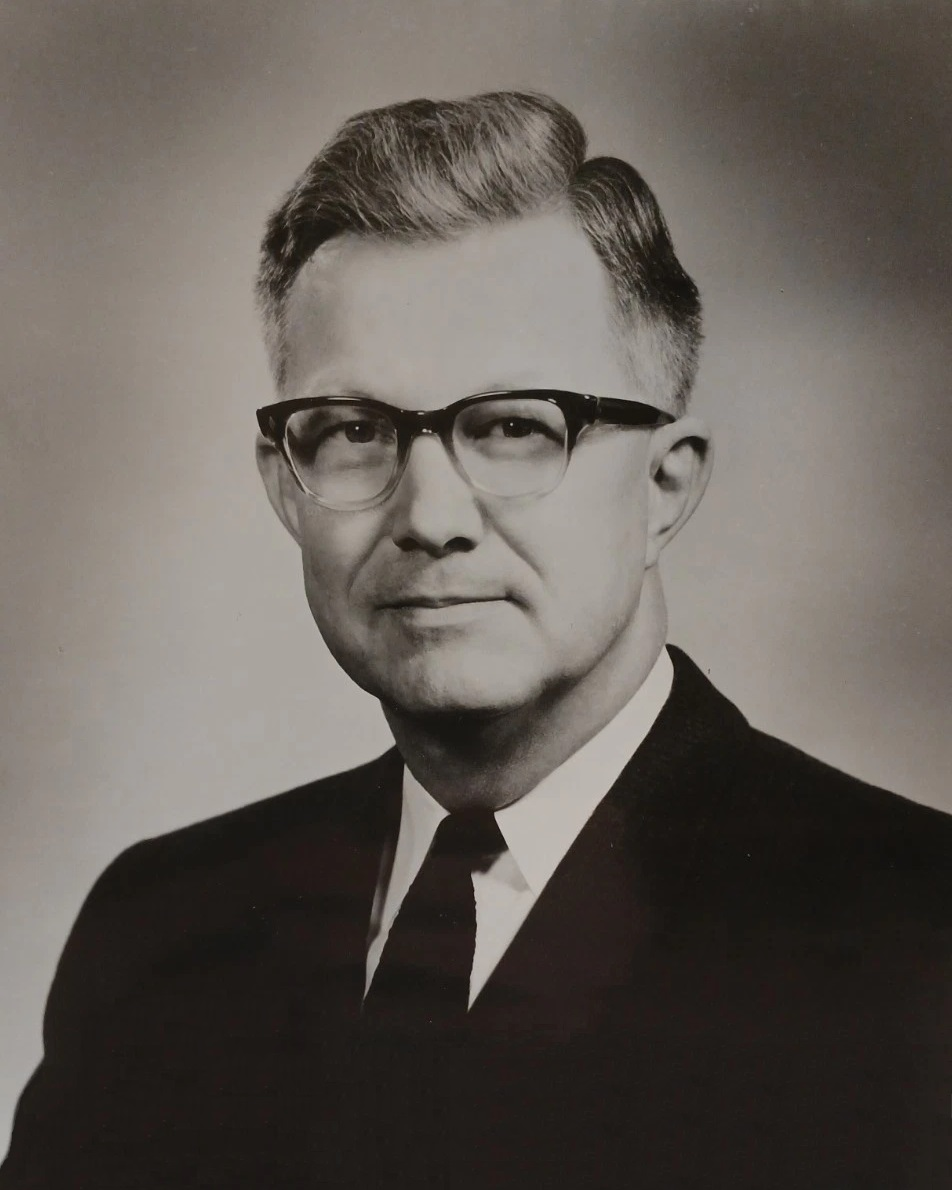
- Official portrait, 1961

Member of the U.S. House of Representatives from Georgia's 10th district
- In office January 3, 1961 – January 3, 1977
- Preceded by: Paul Brown
- Succeeded by: Doug Barnard Jr.

Member of the Georgia House of Representatives from Clarke County
- In office January 12, 1953 – January 12, 1959 Serving with Chappelle Matthews
- Preceded by: Grady Pittard
- Succeeded by: Julian H. Cox

Member of the Georgia State Senate from the 50th district
- In office January 8, 1951 – January 12, 1953
- Preceded by: George B. Brooks
- Succeeded by: John E. Stoddard

Personal details
- Born: Robert Grier Stephens Jr. August 14, 1913 Atlanta, Georgia, U.S.
- Died: February 20, 2003 (aged 89) Athens, Georgia, U.S.
- Resting place: Oconee Hill Cemetery
- Party: Democratic
- Education: University of Georgia (BA, MA, LLB)
- Occupation: Lawyer; educator; politician

Military service
- Branch/service: United States Army
- Years of service: 1941–1946
- Rank: Lieutenant colonel
- Battles/wars: World War II; European theater

Robert Grier Stephens Jr. (August 14, 1913 – February 20, 2003) was a United States representative from Georgia.

== Childhood, family, and education ==
Stephens was born in Atlanta, Georgia. He was a great-great nephew of Alexander Stephens, a grandson of Clement Anselm Evans and a distant cousin of 19th-century U.S. Supreme Court Justice Robert Cooper Grier. Robert Stephens graduated from Boys High School in 1931. He attended the University of Georgia at Athens and obtained a Bachelor of Arts in 1935, a Master of Arts in 1937, and a bachelor of laws (LL.B.) in 1941. During his education at the University if Georgia, he attended the University of Hamburg in Germany in 1935 and 1936.

== Military service and early career ==
He served in the United States Army from September 1941 through March 1946 attaining the rank of lieutenant colonel. While in the army, he was stationed in the United States and in Germany. During the Nuremberg trials following World War II, Stephens served on the staff of Robert H. Jackson, the United States Supreme Court Justice who served as the chief prosecutor for the United States during the trials. After his army service, he joined the University of Georgia faculty. He also maintained a private law practice in Athens in addition to serving as city attorney.

== Politics and later life ==
In 1951, Stephens was elected to the Georgia Senate and was re-elected through 1953, when he was elected to the Georgia House of Representatives. He served in the state House through 1959. He was elected in 1960 as a Democrat representing Georgia's 10th congressional district in the 87th United States Congress, and won re-election to seven additional terms in that body until he chose not to run for re-election in 1976. During his congressional service, Stephens served as a delegate to the 1964 Democratic National Convention. He died on February 20, 2003, in Athens and was buried in that city's Oconee Hill Cemetery.

U.S. House of Representatives
Preceded by Paul Brown	Member of the U.S. House of Representatives from Georgia's 10th congressional district 1961–1977	Succeeded by Doug Barnard Jr.
