= William Harrison Foster =

American physician (1841–1903)

- Born: March 3, 1841; Augusta, Georgia, U.S.
- Died: June 17, 1903 (aged 62)
- Resting place: Magnolia Cemetery, Augusta, Georgia, U.S.
- Occupation: Physician
- Spouse(s): Margaret B. Richardsone (m. –1888; her death); Stella Robinson (m. 1890–1903; his death)
- Children: 6

William Harrison Foster (March 3, 1841 – June 17, 1903) was an American physician who was eminent in Augusta, Georgia, United States. He was described as "one of the most prominent physicians in the state". He also served for the Confederate States Army in several battles of the American Civil War.

== Early life ==
Foster was born in 1841 in Augusta, Georgia, to John Foster and Jane Eleanor Zinn, one of their thirteen known children, though many died young. He received his education at the Academy of Richmond County and Mount Zion High School in Hancock County, Georgia. He graduated from the Medical College of Georgia department at the University of Georgia in Athens in 1867.

== Career ==
In 1861, Foster joined Company A, the Oglethorpe infantry, First Georgia volunteers. He later returned to Augusta and formerd a battalion which became part of the 63rd Georgia regiment at Savannah. In the American Civil War, he served for the Confederate States Army in "all the battles from Dalton to Atlanta". He also fought in Nashville under General John Bell Hood and participated in the battles of Rich Mountain, Cheat Mountain Ford, Hanging Rock, Greenbrier River, Romney Expedition, Kernstown, McDowell, Winchester, Strasburg, Rocky Face Ridge, Dalton, Resaca, New Hope Church, Kennesaw Mountain, Peachtree Creek, Fair Grounds, Jonesborough, Altoona, Franklin, Murfreesboro, Nashville and Bentonville.

At the war's conclusion, in 1865, Foster returned to his medical studies in Augusta. After graduating in 1867, he practiced medicine in Lexington, Georgia, for nine years, before returning to Augusta in 1877. He was made the city's physician in 1878.

In 1901, Foster was professor of Materia Medica and Therapeutics at the University of Georgia.

== Personal life ==
Foster married twice; firstly, in 1859, to Margaret Richardsone, daughter of Savannah physician Cosmo P. Richardsone. She died in 1888, and Foster remarried, in 1890, to Stella Robinson, of Lexington, Georgia. It was her second marriage also, after the death of her husband in 1883.

With Margaret, Foster had eight children, including Maggie, John, Henry, Eva and Eugenia. He had a ninth, Vela, with Stella.

== Death ==
Foster died in 1903, aged 52, from cholera morbus. He was interred in Magnolia Cemetery in Augusta, Georgia, beside his first wife. His second wife was also buried there in 1929.
