= Young Harris (disambiguation) =

Young Harris (1812–1894) was an American lawyer, politician, philanthropist.

Young Harris may also refer to:

- Young Harris, Georgia, a town in Towns County, Georgia
- Young Harris College, a private college in Young Harris, Georgia
