= Sandra Deal =

American education advocate and teacher (1942–2022)

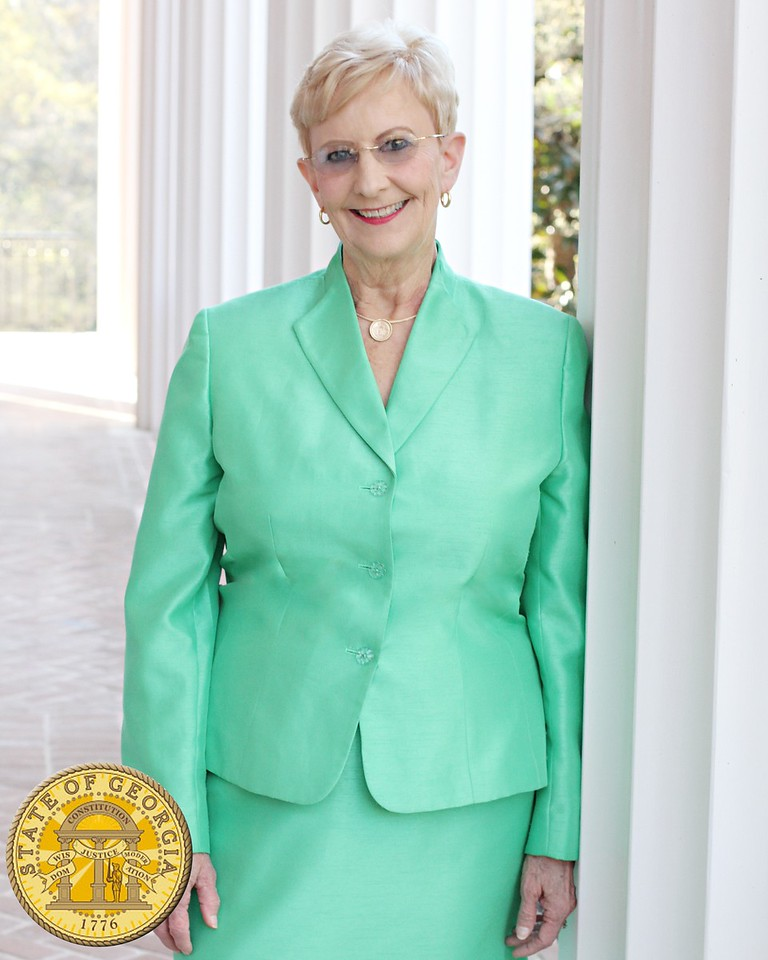
- Official portrait, 2011

First Lady of Georgia
- In role January 10, 2011 – January 14, 2019
- Governor: Nathan Deal
- Preceded by: Mary Perdue
- Succeeded by: Marty Kemp

Personal details
- Born: Emilie Sandra Dunagan; February 1, 1942 Gainesville, Georgia, U.S.
- Died: August 23, 2022 (aged 80) Demorest, Georgia, U.S.
- Party: Republican
- Spouse: Nathan Deal (m. 1966)
- Children: 4
- Education: Georgia College & State University

Emilie Sandra Deal (née Dunagan; February 1, 1942 – August 23, 2022) was an American education advocate and public school language arts teacher. As the wife of Georgia's 82nd Governor, Nathan Deal, she served as the First Lady of Georgia from 2011 to 2019.

== Education ==
The daughter of educators, Emilie Sandra Dunagan grew up in Gainesville, Georgia. She was a two time graduate of Georgia College & State University. She received her bachelor's degree in elementary education in 1963. She received her master's degree in elementary education in 1968.

== Career ==
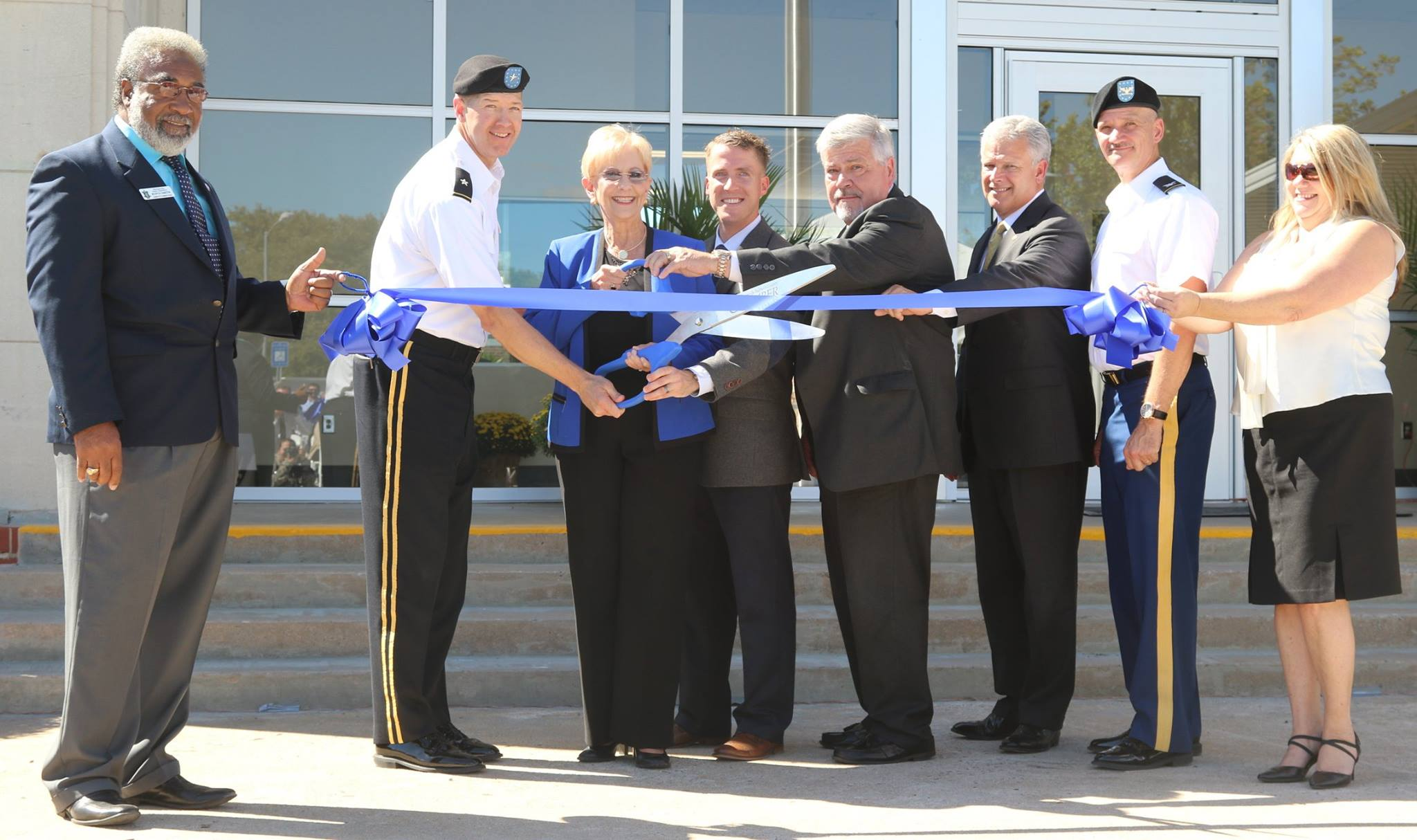
First Lady Deal at the Milledgeville Grand Opening

Before becoming the first lady of Georgia, Dunagan taught language arts at public schools for over 15 years, and retired as a sixth-grade middle-school teacher in Hall County, Georgia. During her tenure as Georgia's first lady, she advocated for literacy and education throughout the state, for which the Georgia Association of Broadcasters awarded her their 2016 "Georgian of the Year" award.

In 2015, her book Memories of the Mansion: The Story of Georgia’s Governor’s Mansion was published. Copies of the book were donated to every public library in the state of Georgia.

In 2016, she served as the keynote speaker at Georgia Gwinnett College's summer commencement.

In 2017, Georgia College & State University unveiled the Sandra Dunagan Deal Center for Early Language and Literacy. A state-funded educational institute, the center aims to provide professional development, or training, to early elementary teachers to improve the early language and literacy skills of Georgia's children by providing research-based professional development for organizations working with children from birth through age 8.

== Personal life ==
Sandra Dunagan married Nathan Deal in 1966. She and Deal had four children.

Sandra Deal was diagnosed with breast cancer in January 2018. She completed radiation treatments in May 2018. On August 23, 2022, she died at her home in Demorest, aged 80, from breast cancer that had spread to her brain.
