= Shirley Miller (Georgia) =

American education advocate and teacher

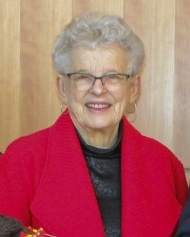
- Miller in 2021

First Lady of Georgia
- In role January 14, 1991 – January 11, 1999
- Governor: Zell Miller
- Preceded by: Elizabeth Harris
- Succeeded by: Marie Barnes

Second Lady of Georgia
- In role January 14, 1975 – January 14, 1991
- Lieutenant Governor: Zell Miller
- Preceded by: Hattie Mattox
- Succeeded by: Nancy Howard

Personal details
- Born: Shirley Carver; July 15, 1935 (age 91) Andrews, North Carolina, U.S.
- Party: Democratic
- Spouse: Zell Miller (m. 1954; died 2018)
- Children: 2
- Education: Young Harris College

Shirley Miller (née Carver; born July 15, 1935) is a retired American educator who served as the first lady of Georgia from 1991 to 1999 as the wife of the 79th governor of Georgia, Zell Miller. Her initiatives as first lady were to improve the quality of education within the state, including helping adults in literacy to earn their GED.

== Early life and education ==
Born in Andrews, North Carolina, Miller grew up in nearby Rail Cove. She moved to Georgia to attend Young Harris College where she met her husband, Zell Miller who served in the United States Marine Corps from 1953 to 1956 before entering politics. The couple married in 1954 following her senior year.

== Career ==
Throughout her career serving Georgia alongside her husband until his death in 2018, Miller has been a strong advocate for education and has promoted adult literacy programs since her husband's tenure as governor. In 1990, Miller helped introduce a new initiative called the Certified Literate Community Program (CLCP) to address rising issues of low literacy rates among adults statewide.

The HOPE Scholarship was created by Governor Miller in 1993 to provide financial aid to students who had achieved a minimum 3.0 GPA as they worked toward their diploma or degree.

In 2011, the Zell Miller scholarship was established for students with a minimum 3.3 GPA in colleges and Universities to reduce costs of tuition.

The Shirley Miller scholarship was also created in order to assist students who are already HOPE scholars a supplement which pays the difference between HOPE and cost of tuition.

A nature preserve located in Walker County, Georgia called the Shirley Miller Wildflower Trail is named after Miller.
