= Marty Kemp =

First Lady of Georgia since 2019

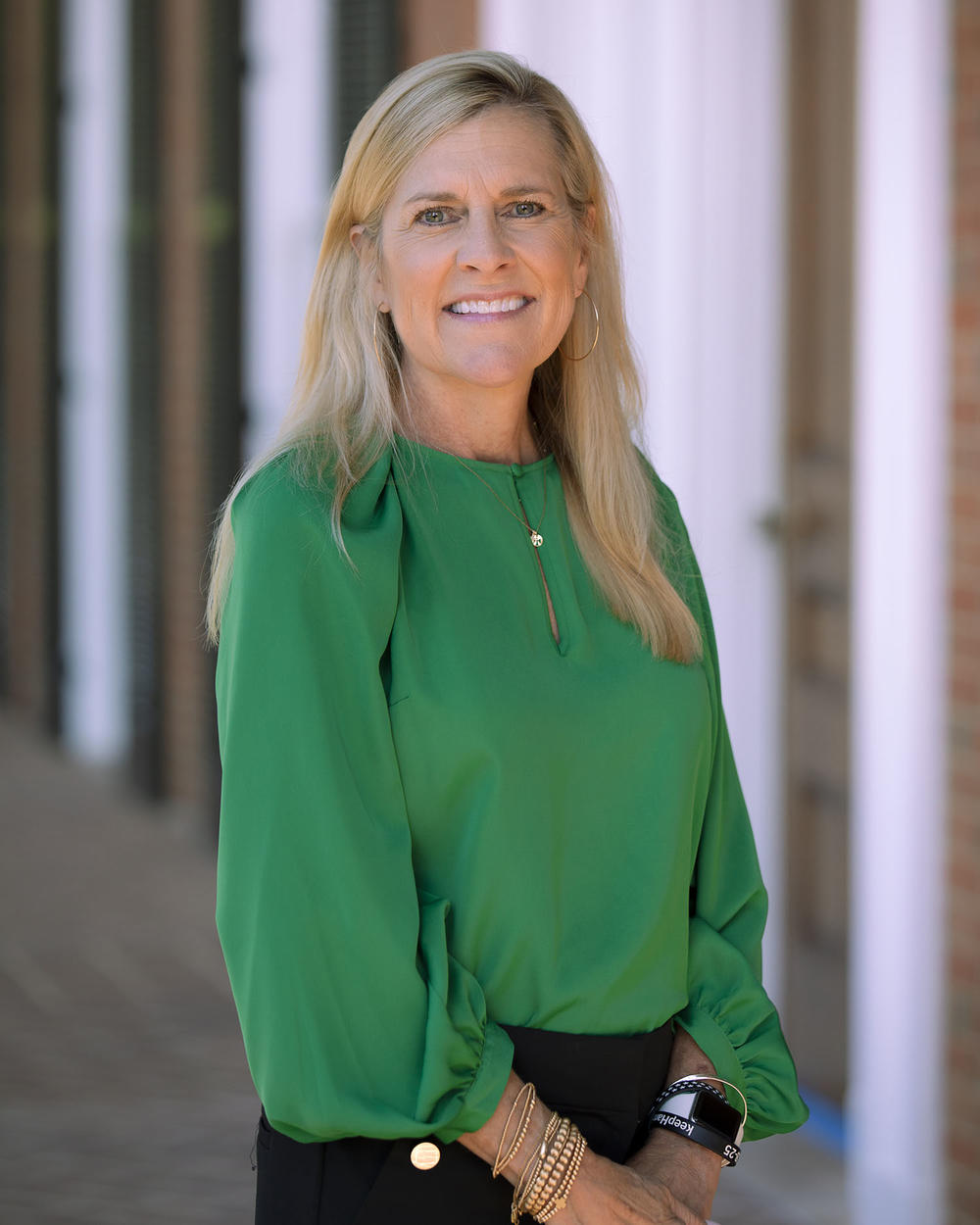
- Official portrait, 2021

First Lady of Georgia
- Current
- Assumed role January 14, 2019
- Governor: Brian Kemp
- Preceded by: Sandra Deal

Personal details
- Born: Marty Argo; May 4, 1966 (age 60) Athens, Georgia, U.S.
- Party: Republican
- Spouse: Brian Kemp (m. 1994)
- Children: 3
- Parent: Bob Argo (father)
- Education: University of Georgia (BS)

Marty Kemp (née Argo; born May 4, 1966) is the first lady of Georgia since 2019, as the wife of the 83rd governor of Georgia, Brian Kemp. She leads initiatives and advocates for the passing of legislation to combat human trafficking and support youth victims of sex trafficking.

== Early life ==
Kemp was born on May 4, 1966. (Note: Sources:) Her father was state representative Bob Argo. Her hometown is Athens, Georgia. Her childhood best friend was Julie Kemp, the sister of her future husband, Brian Kemp. She graduated from Clarke Central High School. Kemp earned a bachelor's degree in consumer economics at the University of Georgia in 1989. She was a cheerleader in college.

== Career ==
After college, Kemp managed her parents' travel agency and worked as the bookkeeper for her husband's construction company. She was also a pre-kindergarten teacher and substitute. Kemp became a full-time parent when her children were young.

During the 2018 Georgia gubernatorial election, she campaigned on her husband's behalf. She used a softer tone than her husband.

Kemp had legislative experience as the daughter of state representative. She began a public initiative to raise awareness and combat human trafficking after her husband took office in 2019. In 2019, she co-chairs the Georgians for Refuge, Action, Compassion, and Education (GRACE) commission that her husband established.

In January 2020, Kemp collaborated with filmmaker Tyler Perry to create a public service announcement about human trafficking awareness in partnership with the Georgia Department of Administrative Services. In 2020, she expedited the plans for the establishment of the Receiving Hope Center, a youth sex trafficking victims recovery center, in northwest Georgia. Kemp worked with lawmakers to write and promote human trafficking legislation. By February 2022, the state had unanimously passed six pieces of related legislation.

In 2021, Kemp advocated for pet adoption. In April 2022, former football player Malcolm Mitchell published a children's book, Hey Georgia, in collaboration with Kemp.

== Personal life ==
Kemp is Episcopalian. She began dating Brian Kemp after college. They married on January 8, 1994. They have three daughters. The family resides on a 41-acre lot in Athens and Clarke counties purchased by her father the day she was born.
