= First ladies of Georgia (U.S. state) =

Title of the spouse of the governor of Georgia

First Lady of Georgia
- Great Seal of the State of Georgia

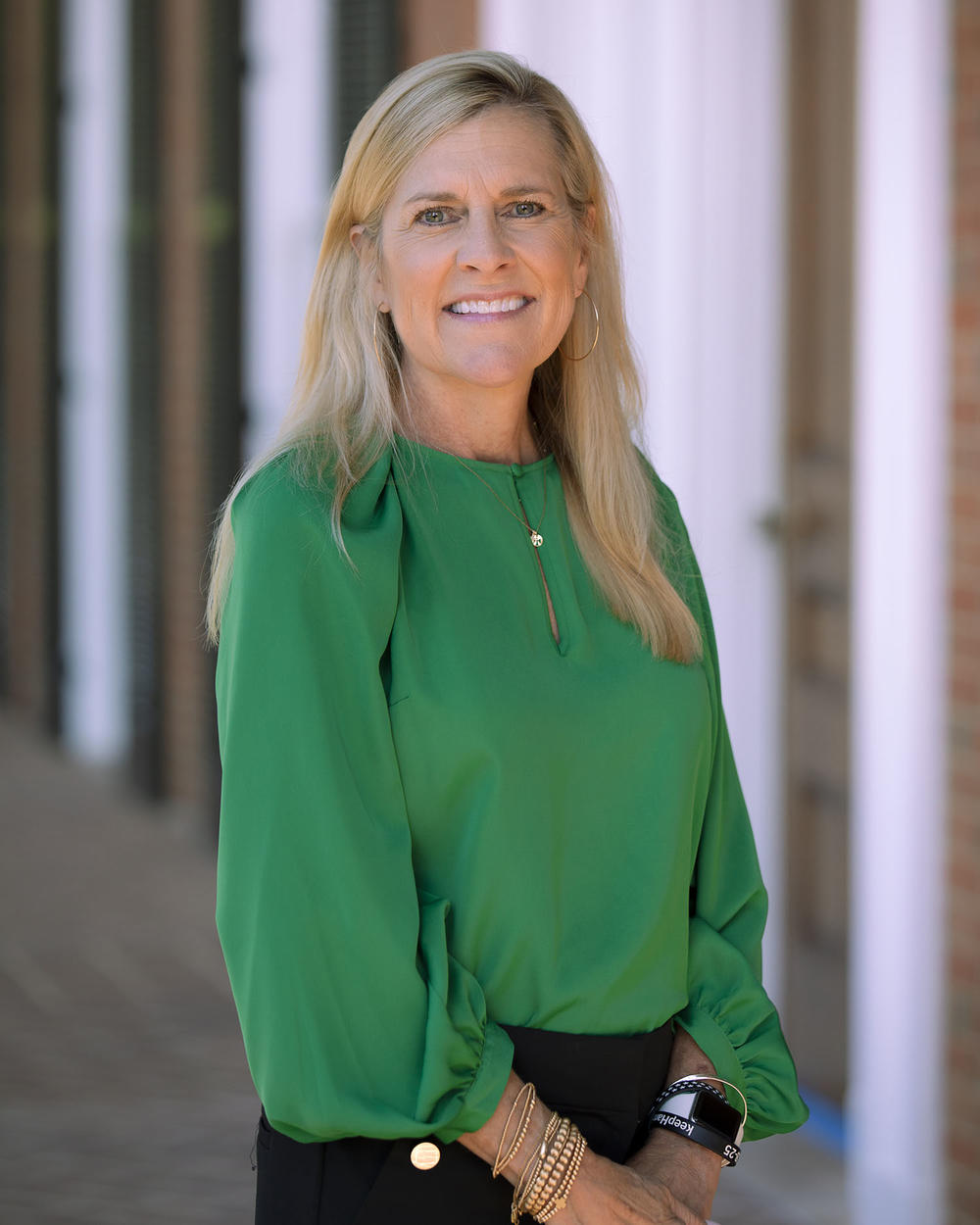
- Current; Marty Kemp since January 14, 2019
- Residence: Georgia Governor's Mansion
- Inaugural holder: Mary de Veaux
- Website: Office of First Lady Marty Kemp

First Lady of Georgia is the title held by the wife of the sitting governor of Georgia. The first lady serves as the official hostess of the Georgia Governor's Mansion.

The current first lady of Georgia is Marty Kemp, the wife of incumbent Governor Brian Kemp, who assumed office in 2019.

== Role ==
The position of the first lady is not an elected one, carries no official duties, and receives no salary. However, the first lady holds a highly visible position in state government. The role of the first lady is the host of the Georgia Governor's Mansion. She organizes and attends official ceremonies and functions of state either along with, or in place of, the governor.

It is common for the governor's spouse to select specific, non-political, causes to promote. For example former first lady Sandra Deal is known for advocating for literacy and education throughout the state, for which the Georgia Association of Broadcasters awarded her their 2016 "Georgian of the Year" award.

== List ==
	Name	Took office	Left office	Spouse of
1	Mary de Veaux	1775	1777	Archibald Bulloch
2	Ann Bourne	1777	1777	Button Gwinnett
3	Marguerite Dupuis, Annie Unselt, third wife (name unknown)	1777	1778	John A. Treutlen
4	Hannah Bryan	1778	1778	John Houstoun
5	Hannah Wilkinson	1779	1779	John Wereat
6	Dorothy Camber	1779	1780	George Walton
7	unknown	1780	1780	Richard Howley
8	Jane Germany, Elizabeth Darden	1780	1780	Stephen Heard
9	Elizabeth Lewis, Elizabeth Dunham, Elizabeth McLean	1781	1782	Nathan Brownson
10	first wife unknown; remarried Mary Deborah Spencer	1782	1783	John Martin
11	Abigail Burr, Mary Osborne	1783	1784	Lyman Hall
12	Hannah Bryan	1784	1785	John Houstoun
13	Elizabeth Rae	1785	1786	Samuel Elbert Elizabeth Rae Elbert
14	Sarah Gibbons	1786	1787	Edward Telfair
15	Anne Paul, Margaret (Cunningham) Reed, Mary Flowers Carpenter	1787	1788	George Mathews
16	Sarah Gibbons	1789	1793	Edward Telfair
17	Sarah Howe	1788	1789	George Handley
18	Miss Williams (first name unknown)	1796	1798	Jared Irwin
19	Mary Charlotte Young	1795	1801	James Jackson
20	Ann Lewis	1801	1801	David Emanuel
21	Harriet Fenwick	1801	1802	Josiah Tattnall
22	Martha Galphin, Ann Lamar	1802	1806	John Milledge
23	Miss Williams (first name unknown)	1806	1809	Jared Irwin
24	Jane Mills	1809	1813	David Brydie Mitchell
25	Ann Adams Smith	1813	1815	Peter Early
26	Jane Mills	1815	1817	David Brydie Mitchell
27	Mary Battle	1817	1819	William Rabun
28	Anna Twinning	1819	1819	Matthew Talbot
29	Nancy Williamson	1819	1823	John Clark
30	Anne St. Clair McCormick, Anne Carter	1823	1827	George M. Troup
31	Clara Meigs	1827	1829	John Forsyth
32	Eliza Frances Grattan	1829	1831	George Rockingham Gilmer
33	Elizabeth Walker, Annis Hopkins	1831	1835	Wilson Lumpkin
34	Charlotte Kirkley, Elizabeth Sarah (Jackson) Hargrove, Sophia E. Kerr	1835	1837	William Schley
35	Eliza Frances Grattan	1829	1831	George Rockingham Gilmer
36	Anne Franklin, Elizabeth (Roane) Ruffin	1839	1843	Charles James McDonald
37	Mary Ann McIntosh	1843	1847	George W. Crawford
38	Margaret Jane Campbell, Mary Winston-Jones	1847	1851	George W. Towns
39	Mary Ann Lamar	1851	1853	Howell Cobb 125x125
40	Ann Polk Walker	1853	1857	Herschel Vespasian Johnson
41	Elizabeth Grisham	1857	1865	Joseph Emerson Brown Statue of Governor Joseph E. Brown and wife, Elizabeth Grisham Brown, Georgia State Capitol, Atlanta, Georgia
42	Ann Harris	1865	1865	James Johnson
43	Sarah Jones, Emily Barnes	1865	1868	Charles Jones Jenkins
44	Helen Lydia Moore	1868	1868	Thomas Howard Ruger
45	Marie Salisbury	1868	1871	Rufus Brown Bullock
46	Sarah H. Semmes	1871	1872	Benjamin F. Conley
47	Hester A. Brown, Sarah Marshall Welborn	1872	1877	James Milton Smith
48	Dorothy Tarver, Sarah Tarver	1877	1882	Alfred Holt Colquitt
49	never married	1882	1883	Alexander Hamilton Stephens
50	Fannie Loyall, Susie T. Harris	1883	1883	James Boynton
51	Hester C. Felker	1883	1886	Henry Dickerson McDaniel
52	Fannie R. Haralson	1886	1890	John Brown Gordon
53	Martha Moss Neel	1890	1894	William J. Northen
54	Susan Cobb Milton	1894	1898	William Yates Atkinson Susan Cobb Milton Atkinson, 1898
55	Eugenia T. Williams	1898	1902	Allen D. Candler
56	Jessie Lee Spivey	1902	1907	Joseph M. Terrell
57	Marion "Birdie" Cobb	1907	1909	Hoke Smith Marion "Birdie" Cobb Smith with ladies of the cabinet of President Grover Cleveland, 1894
58	Cora A. McCord	1909	1911	Joseph Mackey Brown
59	Marion "Birdie" Cobb	1911	1911	Hoke Smith
60	Sarah Frances Grant Jackson	1911	1912	John Marshall Slaton
61	Cora A. McCord	1912	1913	Joseph Mackey Brown
62	Sarah Frances Grant Jackson	1913	1915	John Marshall Slaton Sarah Frances Grant Jackson Slaton, 1910
63	Sarah Gibbons	1915	1917	Nathaniel Edwin Harris
64	Mary Adair Wilkinson	1917	1921	Hugh Dorsey
65	Sarah Gibbons	1921	1923	Thomas W. Hardwick
66	Rosa Carter Matthewson	1923	1927	Clifford Walker
67	Emma Wiley Griffin	1927	1931	Lamartine Griffin Hardman
68	never married	1931	1933	Richard Russell, Jr.
69	Mattie (Thurmond) Peterson	1933	1937	Eugene Talmadge
70	Lucille Lashley	1937	1941	Eurith D. Rivers
71	Mattie (Thurmond) Peterson	1941	1943	Eugene Talmadge
72	Mildred Slemons	1943	1947	Ellis Arnall
73	Betty Shingler	1947	1947	Herman Eugene Talmadge
74	Ann Newton	1947	1948	Melvin E. Thompson
75	Betty Shingler	1948	1955	Herman Eugene Talmadge
76	Mary Elizabeth Smith, Laura Jane Gibson	1955	1959	Samuel Marvin Griffin
77	Sybil Elizabeth Russell	1959	1963	Ernest Vandiver
78	Betty Bird Foy	1963	1967	Carl Sanders
79	Virginia Cox	1967	1971	Lester Maddox
80	Rosalynn Smith	1971	1975	Jimmy Carter Rosalynn Carter, 1977
81	Mary Elizabeth Talbot	1975	1983	George Busbee
82	Elizabeth Carlock	1983	1991	Joe Frank Harris
83	Shirley Carver	1991	1999	Zell Miller
84	Marie Dobbs	1999	2003	Roy E. Barnes Marie Dobbs Barnes, Nov. 2, 2010
85	Mary Ruff	2003	2011	Sonny Perdue Mary Ruff Perdue at the 63rd Annual Peabody Awards Luncheon, Waldorf-Astoria Hotel, May 17, 2004
86	Sandra Deal	2011	2019	Nathan Deal First Lady Sandra Deal at the Milledgeville YCA Ribbon Cutting, October 12, 2016
87	Marty Kemp	2019	present	Brian Kemp Marty Kemp with Gov. Brian Kemp
