= Mary Ann Lamar Cobb =

First Lady of Georgia (U.S. state) from 1851–1853

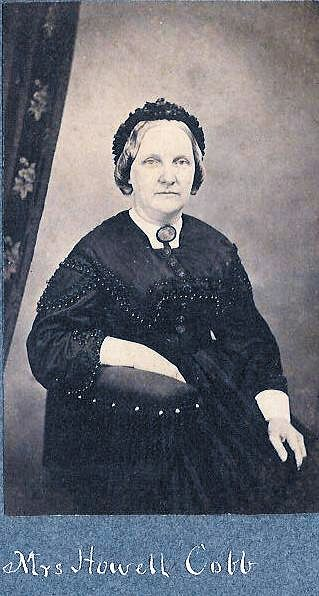
- Cobb in 1865

First Lady of Georgia
- Assumed role 1851–1853
- Governor: Howell Cobb
- Preceded by: Mary Winston-Jones Towns
- Succeeded by: Ann Polk Walker Johnson

Personal details
- Born: Mary Ann Lamar; April 23, 1818 Milledgeville, Georgia, U.S.
- Died: November 27, 1889 (aged 71) Athens, Georgia, U.S.
- Resting place: Oconee Hill Cemetery
- Spouse: Howell Cobb
- Children: 12 (including Mary and Andrew)

Mary Ann Lamar Cobb (April 23, 1818 – November 27, 1889) was an American civic leader and slaveowner who served as the First Lady of Georgia from 1851 to 1853. She led the Athens Ladies Aid Society, supporting Confederate soldiers during the Civil War.

== Early life and family ==
Cobb was born Mary Ann Lamar on April 23, 1818 in Milledgeville, Georgia. She was the only daughter of Colonel Zechariah Lamar, a wealthy planter and entrepreneur, and Mary Ann Robinson. Her family, of Huguenot ancestry, was prominent throughout multiple Southern states. She had two brothers, Colonel John B. Lamar and Andrew J. Lamar, and she was a first cousin of Mirabeau B. Lamar and a second cousin of Lucius Quintus Cincinnatus Lamar.

Cobb enjoyed an affluent and privileged upbringing among Georgia's social and economic elite. She spent her early years on her family's plantation. Cobb was educated at Dr. Brown's Boarding School in Scottsboro, where she studied sewing, needlepoint, and how to make wax flowers, as well as other traditional subjects for hostessting and homemaking.

== Civic roles ==
When her husband served as governor of Georgia, Cobb often stayed in Athens with the children and servants while her husband stayed in Atlanta. While he served as a congressman for Georgia, and later as Speaker of the United States House of Representatives and United States Secretary of the Treasury, Cobb would occasionally take her children to join her husband in Washington, D.C.

In 1860, she was presented to Edward, Prince of Wales by President James Buchanan during a state dinner at the White House. She was seated next to Henry Pelham-Clinton, 5th Duke of Newcastle at the dinner.

During the American Civil War, her husband and three sons served in the Confederate States Army and her husband was elected as president of the Provisional Confederate Congress. She joined the Athens Ladies Aid Society to help Confederate soldiers in combat and provide care to those who were wounded in battle. She and other wealthy women of Athens high society made clothes, bandages, and packages with treats and necessities for the Confederate troops. During the latter part of the war, she spent several months volunteering in Confederate hospitals in Macon.

== Personal life and death ==
She married Howell Cobb, a law student from Athens, in 1835. Her dowry included almost one hundred slaves and one thousand acres of land. The couple had twelve children, six of whom survived to adulthood, including Andrew J. Cobb and Mary Ann Cobb Erwin.

The Cobbs lived in a large house on Prince Avenue in Athens until facing bankruptcy from the Panic of 1837, when they lost their home and many of their possessions through a sheriff's auction in 1843. During this time, they settled on her father-in-law's plantation in Walton County and, after several years, they purchased a six room cottage on Hill Street in Athens from Watkins Baynon. They later built a Greek Revival mansion on the lot. She spent winters in Macon with her brother.

In the 1840s, she joined First Baptist Church of Athens and was an active worshipper there.

Throughout her life, Cobb suffered from indifferent health, prone to bouts of melancholia, neuralgia, and poor eyesight. After suffering a partial paralysis of the brain, she died on November 27, 1889.
