= Sarah E. Gabbett =

American medal designer (1833–1911)

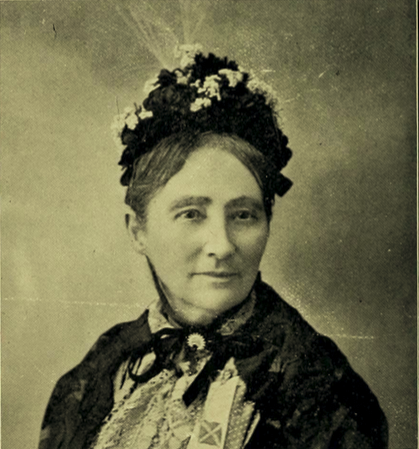
Gabbett in 1911

Sarah Elizabeth Gabbett (née Richardson; 1833–1911) was an American medal designer. She was the first Custodian of the Southern Cross of Honor, and later, she became the honorary custodian for life. Due to her zeal in designing the Cross of Honor, she became one of the most conspicuous women in the United Daughters of the Confederacy (UDC). Wrapped in an atmosphere of a bygone day, cherishing an abiding love for her husband, an Irish emigrant and Confederate States Army veteran, she was all but a recluse. She only interacted with the outside world for causes related to betterment of the Confederate veteran.

== Early life ==
Sarah Elizabeth Richardson was born in Savannah, Georgia, on July 16, 1833, and her early days were spent there. She was the eldest and only surviving daughter of Dr. Cosmo P. Richardsone, of Savannah. Her mother, Margaret (née Bailey), of Hancock County, Georgia, died while Gabbett was a young girl, and her father died in 1852. Their residence in Savannah was considered the finest in the city just before the civil war, but on the eve of Sherman's march into the city, it was burned. Mr. Richardson was one of the first captains of the Old Volunteer Guards of that city. Prior to his death, the Guards presented him with a sword, which was hung in the Guards’ Armory in Savannah. After his death, they constructed a marble monument in Laurel Grove Cemetery in his memory. Gabbett was very proud of her father, and often spoke of him, and of her brave young brother, Cosmo, who took part in the first bombardment of Fort Sumter with General P. G. T. Beauregard, his tutor.

== Career ==
=== Civil war ===
In 1852, she married William Gabbett, of landed property, from Mount Minnett, County Limerick, Ireland. Some time after their marriage, they came to Savannah from their home in Ireland, and resided there for several years. He espoused the cause of the Confederacy, enlisting in Cobb's Legion. Later, he was transferred to an engineer corps under General John B. Magruder, and afterwards detailed for mining work in North Georgia, Alabama, and Tennessee. He was said to have furnished the governor with more ammunition of war than any other officer.

Shortly after the war, Mr. Gabbett's father died at the ancestral home in Ireland, and Mr. Gabbett came into possession of the old family estate. He returned to Ireland, where he lived until his death, which was the result of a sunstroke received during the war.

=== UDC ===
Gabbett travelled extensively after the war, spending a great portion of her time in Ireland looking after her landed estates.

In 1896, (Note: According to Collier (1920), Mrs. Gabbett returned to Georgia in 1895.) Gabbett returned to Georgia, and made her home in Atlanta. After her return to the U.S., Gabbett became very interested in the UDC. She joined the UDC as soon as the Atlanta Chapter was organised and became enthusiastic in its patriotic work.

In 1898, when Mary Ann Cobb Erwin told Gabbett about the idea of the Southern Cross of Honor, Gabbett became excited, and urged Mrs. Erwin to prepare resolutions and have the UDC act upon them. She discussed with Mrs. Erwin and Mrs. Plane the design of the badge. According to Collier (1920), Gabbett spoke of a design after the Cross of Dannebrog which she sentimentally believed to be the same in large measure as the Cross that was adopted. According to the Confederate Veteran (1911), it was said that Gabbett chose her design for the cross of honor from an old tombstone in Ireland. At any rate, Mrs. Erwin said that Gabbett suggested the Deo vindice from the Seal of the Confederate States to be inscribed around the battle flag. The United Confederate Veterans (UCV) admired Gabbett, and one of the camps in Atlanta made her an honorary member of it. She always addressed them as "Comrades". In a speech delivered at Los Angeles, she assured the veterans that the Cross should be protected. Below is an extract from the speech made upon that occasion:

"I, as Custodian, desire to assure the veterans that every possible precaution shall be taken to keep the integrity of the cross inviolate. Intended as a gift of love and honor to the brave defenders of their rights, the Daughters of the Confederacy shall protect it from falling into the hands of the unworthy. To that end, a patent has been se¬ cured and certificates of eligibility, duly signed, required from every applicant for the Cross."

At the UDC Convention at Richmond, Va., in 1899, Mrs. Weed presiding, Gabbett was made Custodian of the Cross, and a committee given her to draw up the rules regulating its bestowal. Thereafter, she annually gave her report to the convention. In 1905, she became very feeble and the work strained her, so she presented her resignation at New Orleans in 1910 and her successor was named, Mrs. L. H. Raines, of Savannah, Georgia.

In her later life, she was presented with a large gold cross of honor by the UCV of Georgia.

== Personal life ==
Gabbett owned a large amount of property on Bedford Place, and her estate was considered a valuable one. One of Gabbett's possessions was a string of huge amber beads, typically only worn by Ireland's kings. These beads were dug up on the estate of her husband. She was deeply interested in art and music, and spent several years in the music and art centers in Europe. She was an inveterate collector of curios and works of art. Her house on Bedford Place was tilled with rare pictures, valuable silverware, and a large amount of exquisite old Irish lace which had been handed down by the Gabbett family. One of her hobbies was dogs; she had six blueblood pugs. In addition, she had twelve or thirteen canines which she found wandering homeless around the streets. She cared for them and they had a special yard to themselves.

== Death and legacy ==
Sarah E. Gabbett died at her home, in Atlanta, on July 16, 1911, after a few weeks of serious illness, although she had been failing in health for a year; interment was in Savannah. She was buried with military honors, and many veterans attended her funeral.

She had no children, and none of her brothers or sisters survived her. She left an estate of US$10,000 or more. Her jewelry was to be sold for the Home of the Friendless, and $500 was left to Episcopal Cathedral of Saint Philip, in Atlanta. The remainder went to relatives.
