= Howell Cobb =

American politician and Confederate States Army officer (1815–1868)

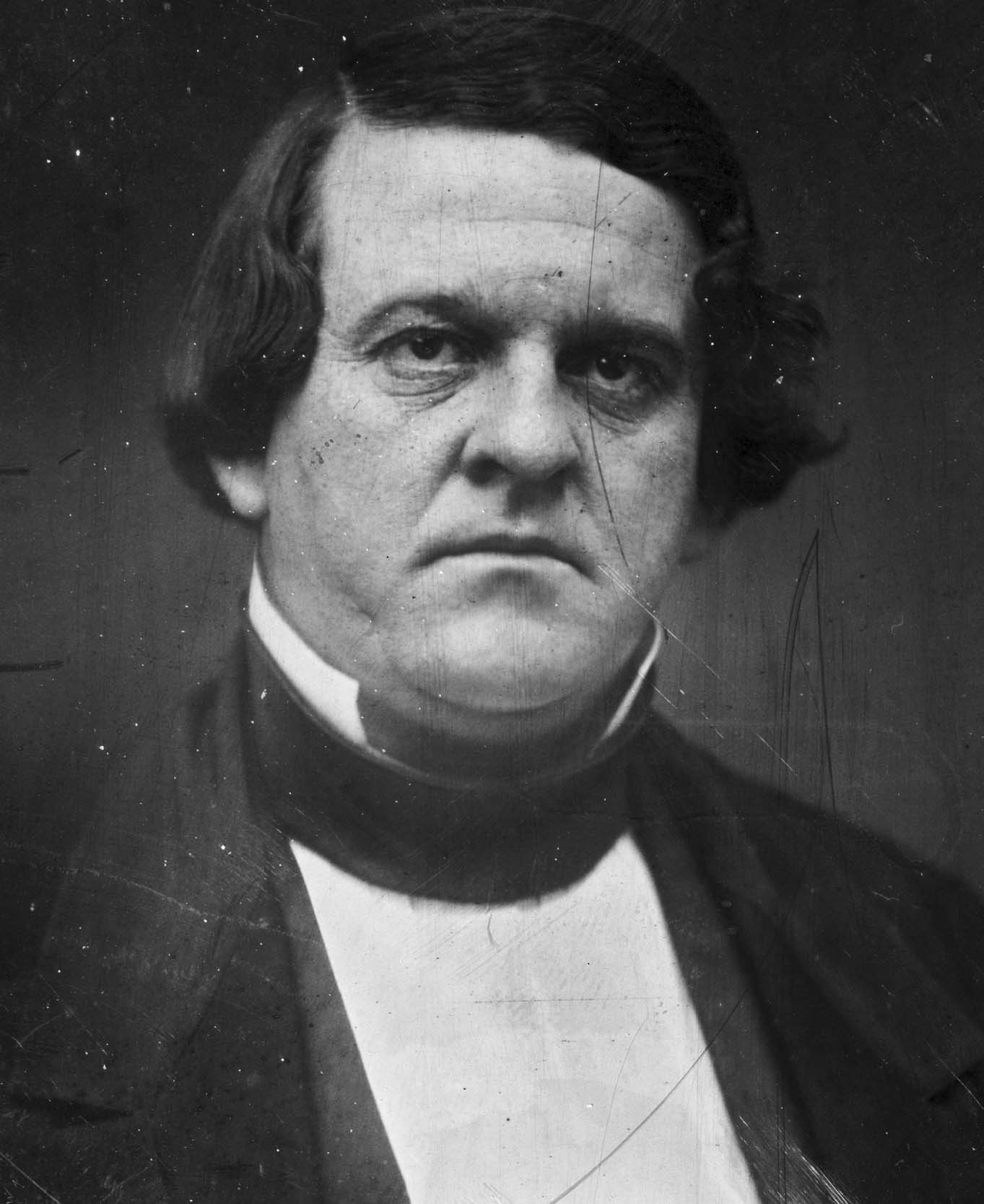

President of the Confederate States Provisional Congress
- In office February 4, 1861 – February 18, 1862
- Preceded by: Position established
- Succeeded by: Position abolished

22nd United States Secretary of the Treasury
- In office March 7, 1857 – December 8, 1860
- President: James Buchanan
- Preceded by: James Guthrie
- Succeeded by: Philip Thomas

40th Governor of Georgia
- In office November 5, 1851 – November 9, 1853
- Preceded by: George Towns
- Succeeded by: Herschel Johnson

19th Speaker of the United States House of Representatives
- In office December 22, 1849 (Note: multi-ballot election; voting lasted 19 days (The total vacancy was over eight months; Congress simply didn't vote or do any work until December.)) – March 3, 1851
- Preceded by: Robert Winthrop
- Succeeded by: Linn Boyd

Leader of the House Democratic Caucus
- In office December 4, 1843 – March 4, 1845
- Preceded by: John Winston Jones
- Succeeded by: Linn Boyd

Member of the U.S. House of Representatives from Georgia
- In office March 4, 1843 – March 3, 1851
- Preceded by: James Meriwether (AL); District established (6th)
- Succeeded by: District eliminated (AL); Junius Hillyer (6th)
- Constituency: At-large district (1843-45); 6th district (1845-51)
- In office March 4, 1855 – March 3, 1857
- Preceded by: Junius Hillyer
- Succeeded by: James Jackson
- Constituency: 6th district

Personal details
- Born: September 7, 1815 Cherry Hill, Georgia, U.S.
- Died: October 9, 1868 (aged 53) New York City, New York, U.S.
- Party: Democratic (Before 1851; 1853–1868); Constitutional Union (1851–1853) (Note: Not to be confused with Constitutional Union Party of 1860, the Constitutional Union Party in Georgia was a brief merger of the Democratic and Whig state parties.)
- Spouse: Mary Ann Lamar
- Children: 12 (including Mary and Andrew)
- Relatives: Thomas Cobb (brother); Sarah Johnson Cocke (niece); Alice Culler Cobb (sister-in-law)
- Education: University of Georgia (BA)

Military service
- Allegiance: Confederate States
- Branch/service: Confederate States Army
- Years of service: 1861–1865
- Rank: Major general
- Unit: Army of Northern Virginia
- Commands: 16th Georgia Infantry Regiment; Cobb's Brigade; District of Georgia and Florida; Georgia Reserve Corps
- Battles/wars: American Civil War; Peninsula campaign; Seven Days Battles; Maryland campaign; Battle of South Mountain; Battle of Antietam; Wilson's Raid; Battle of Columbus (1865)

Major General Howell Cobb (September 7, 1815 – October 9, 1868) was an American politician and Confederate States Army officer. A southern Democrat, Cobb was a five-term member of the United States House of Representatives and the speaker of the House from 1849 to 1851. He also served as the 40th governor of Georgia (1851–1853) and as a secretary of the treasury under President James Buchanan (1857–1860).

Cobb is, however, best known as one of the founders of the Confederate States of America, having served as the President of the Provisional Congress of the Confederate States where delegates of the Southern slave states declared that they had seceded from the United States and created the Confederacy.

== Early life and education ==
Howell Cobb was born on September 7, 1815, in Jefferson County, Georgia, the son of Sarah (née Rootes) and John A. Cobb. (Note: John Cobb's brother, Henry Cobb, was the father of Susan Amanda Cobb, the first wife of Florida Civil War Governor John Milton.) He was of Welsh American descent. Cobb was raised in Athens, Georgia, and studied at Franklin College (now the University of Georgia), where he became a member of the Phi Kappa Literary Society. He was admitted to the bar in 1836 and was soon appointed solicitor general of Georgia’s western judicial circuit.

In 1836, he served as a presidential elector in the presidential election. On May 26, 1835, Cobb married Mary Ann Lamar, the daughter of Colonel Zachariah Lamar of Milledgeville, a member of a prominent Southern family. Her relatives included Texas President Mirabeau B. Lamar and Georgia financier Gazaway Bugg Lamar. The couple had twelve children between 1838 and 1861, though several died in childhood, including their last, a son named after Cobb’s brother, Thomas Reade Rootes Cobb.

== Career ==
=== Congressman ===
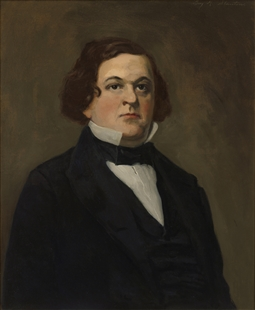
Lucy May Stanton, Howell Cobb, 1912, Collection of the U.S. House of Representatives

Cobb was elected as Democrat to the 28th, 29th, 30th and 31st Congresses. He was chairman of the U.S. House Committee on Mileage during the 28th Congress, and Speaker of the United States House of Representatives during the 31st Congress.

He sided with President Andrew Jackson on the question of nullification (i.e. compromising on import tariffs), and was an effective supporter of President James K. Polk's administration during the Mexican–American War. He was an ardent advocate of extending slavery into the territories, but when the Compromise of 1850 had been agreed upon, he became its staunch supporter as a Union Democrat. He joined Georgia Whigs Alexander Stephens and Robert Toombs in a statewide campaign to elect delegates to a state convention that overwhelmingly affirmed, in the Georgia Platform, that the state accepted the Compromise as the final resolution to the outstanding slavery issues. On that issue, Cobb was elected governor of Georgia by a large majority.

=== Speaker of the House ===
After 63 ballots, he became Speaker of the House on December 22, 1849, at the age of 34. In 1850—following the July 9 death of Zachary Taylor and the accession of Millard Fillmore to the presidency—Cobb, as Speaker, would have been next in line to the presidency for two days due to the resultant vice presidential vacancy and a president pro tempore of the Senate vacancy, except he did not meet the minimum eligibility for the presidency of being 35 years old. The Senate elected William R. King as president pro tempore on July 11.

=== Governor of Georgia ===
In 1851, Cobb left the House to serve as the Governor of Georgia, holding that post until 1853. He published A Scriptural Examination of the Institution of Slavery in the United States: With its Objects and Purposes in 1856.

=== Return to Congress and Secretary of the Treasury ===
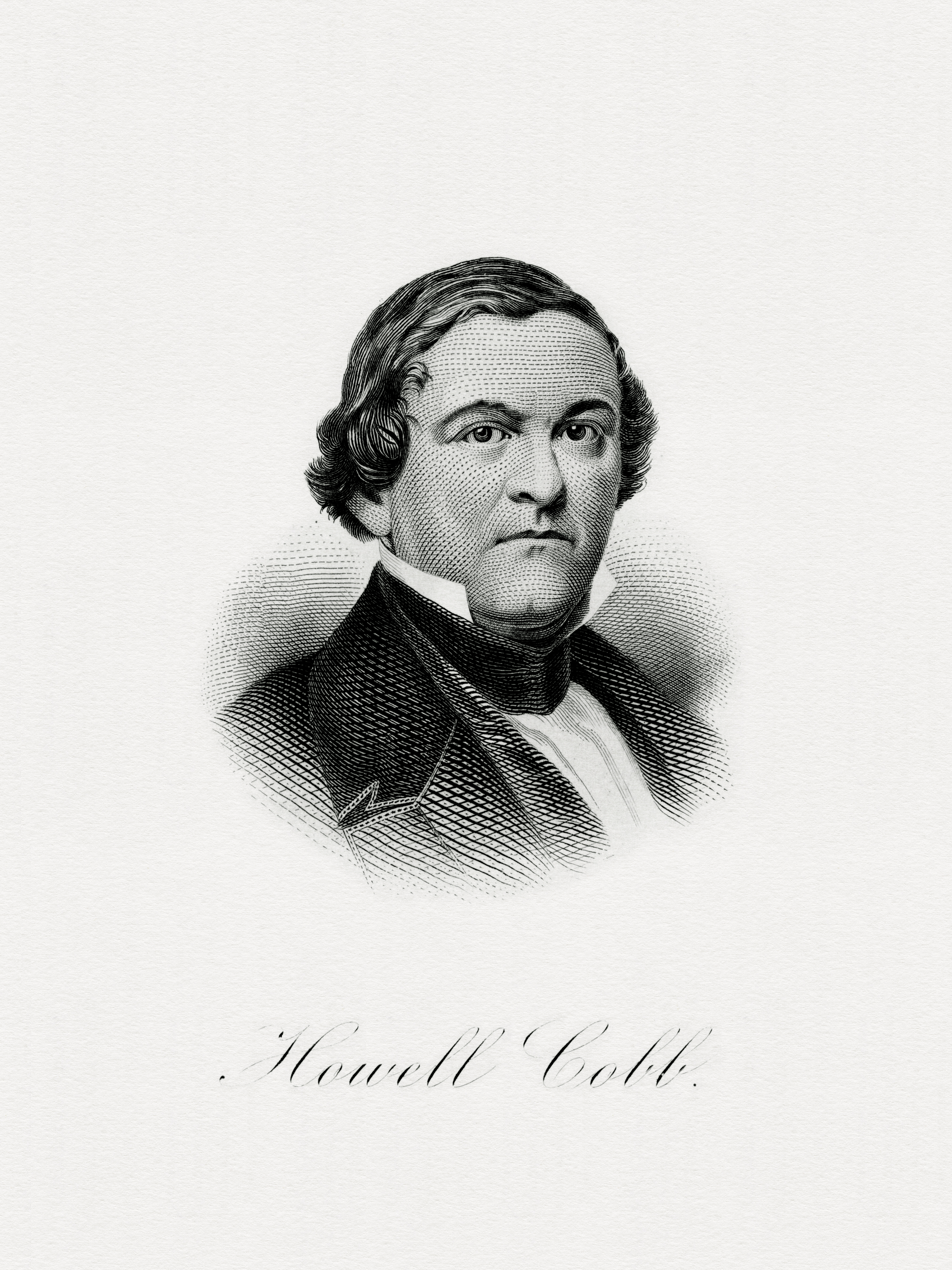
Bureau of Engraving and Printing portrait of Cobb as Secretary of the Treasury

He was elected to the 34th Congress before being appointed as Secretary of the Treasury in Buchanan's Cabinet. He served for three years, resigning in December 1860. At one time, Cobb was Buchanan's choice for his successor.

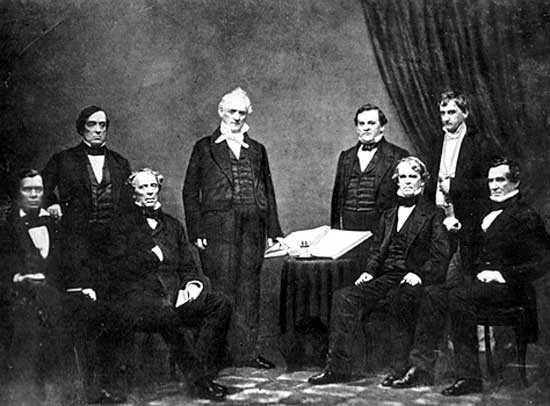
President James Buchanan and Cabinet, 1859. Photograph by Mathew Brady

=== A Founder of the Confederacy ===
In 1860, Cobb ceased to be a Unionist, and became a leader of the secession movement, not surprising since he once owned 1000 slaves. He was president of a convention of the seceded states that assembled in Montgomery, Alabama, on February 4, 1861. Under Cobb's guidance, the delegates drafted a constitution for the new Confederacy. He served as president of several sessions of the Confederate Provisional Congress, and swore in Jefferson Davis as president of the Confederacy before resigning to join the military when war erupted.

=== American Civil War ===
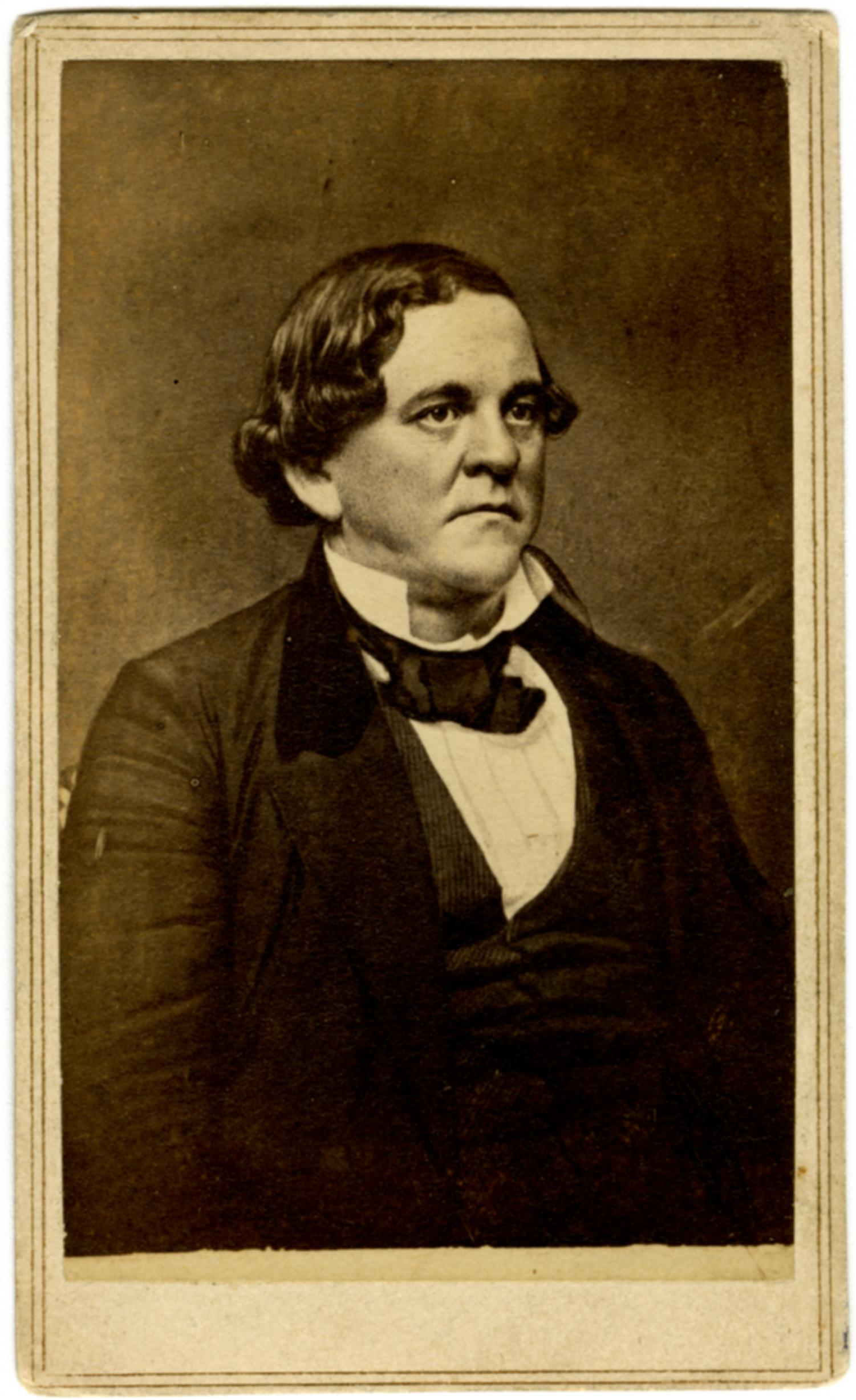
General Howell Cobb

Cobb joined the Confederate States Army in Summer 1861 and was commissioned as colonel of the 16th Georgia Infantry Regiment. He was promoted to brigadier general on February 13, 1862, and assigned command of a brigade in the Army of Northern Virginia. Between February and June 1862, Cobb represented the Confederate government in negotiations with Union commanders for an agreement on the exchange of prisoners of war. His efforts in these discussions contributed to the Dix-Hill Cartel accord reached in July 1862. Cobb commanded his brigade during the Peninsula campaign and Seven Days Battles, and during the Maryland campaign the brigade played a key role at the Battle of South Mountain, where it arrived at a critical time to delay a Union advance through Crampton's Gap but suffered heavy casualties in doing so. Cobb and his brigade subsequently fought at the Battle of Antietam.

In October 1862, Cobb was detached from the Army of Northern Virginia and sent to the District of Middle Florida. He was promoted to major general on September 9, 1863, and placed in command of the District of Georgia and Florida. Cobb suggested the construction of a prisoner-of-war camp in southern Georgia, a location thought to be safe from Union incursions. This led to the creation of Andersonville Prison. When Union army forces under Major General William T. Sherman invaded Georgia during the 1864 Atlanta campaign which was followed by Sherman's March to the Sea, Cobb opposed the invasions in command of the Georgia Reserve Corps. In the spring of 1865, with the Confederacy clearly waning, he was sent with his troops to Columbus, Georgia to assist in resisting Wilson's Raid. Cobb was subsequently defeated at the Battle of Columbus on, April 16, 1865.

During Sherman's March to the Sea, the Union general's army camped one night near Cobb's plantation. When Sherman discovered that the house he planned to stay in for the night belonged to Cobb, whom Sherman described in his Memoirs as "one of the leading rebels of the South, then a general in the Southern army", he dined in the plantation's slave quarters, confiscated Cobb's property and ordered the plantation burned, instructing his subordinates to "spare nothing."

In the final year of the war, Cobb unsuccessfully opposed attempts to enlist Black men into the Confederate army. In a letter he sent to Confederate States Secretary of War James Seddon on January 8, 1865, Cobb wrote:

You cannot make soldiers of slaves, nor slaves of soldiers. The moment you resort to negro soldiers your white soldiers will be lost to you; and one secret of the favor with which the proposition is received in portions of the Army is the hope that when negroes go into the Army they will be permitted to retire. It is simply a proposition to fight the balance of the war with negro troops. You can’t keep white and black troops together, and you can’t trust negroes by themselves. It is difficult to get negroes enough for the purpose indicated in the President‘s message, much less enough for an Army. Use all the negroes you can get, for all the purposes for which you need them, but don’t arm them. The day you make soldiers of them is the beginning of the end of the revolution. If slaves will make good soldiers our whole theory of slavery is wrong but they won’t make soldiers. As a class they are wanting in every qualification of a soldier. Better by far to yield to the demands of England and France and abolish slavery, and thereby purchase their aid, than to resort to this policy, which leads as certainly to ruin and subjugation as it is adopted.

Cobb surrendered to Union forces at Macon, Georgia on April 20, 1865.

== Later life and death ==
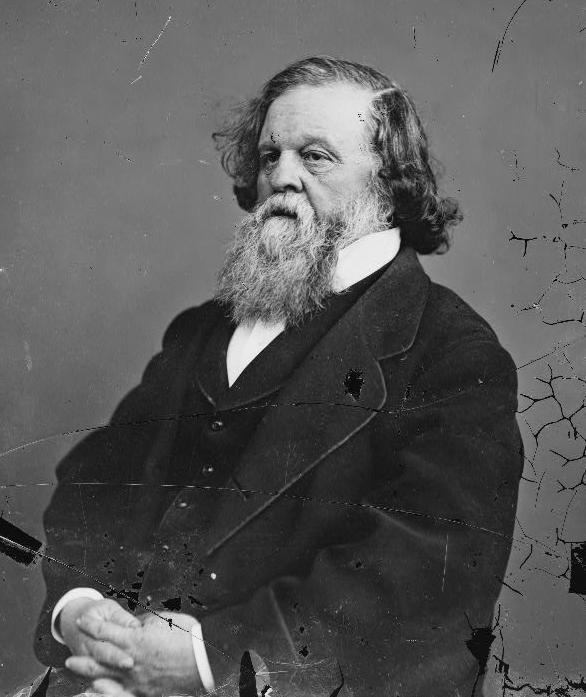
Cobb in his postbellum days

Following the end of the Civil War, Cobb returned home and resumed his law practice. Despite pressure from his former constituents and soldiers, he refused to make any public remarks on Reconstruction policy until he received a presidential pardon, although he privately opposed the policy. Finally receiving the pardon in early 1868, he began to vigorously oppose the Reconstruction Acts, making a series of speeches that summer that bitterly denounced the policies of Radical Republicans in the U.S. Congress.

That autumn, Cobb vacationed in New York City, and died of a heart attack there. His body was returned to Athens, Georgia, for burial in Oconee Hill Cemetery.

== Legacy ==
As a former Speaker of the House, his portrait had been on display in the US Capitol. The portrait was removed from public display in the Speaker's Lobby outside the House Chamber after an order issued by the Speaker of the House, Nancy Pelosi on June 18, 2020, during the George Floyd protests.

== Cobb family ==
The Cobb family included many prominent Georgians from both before and after the Civil War era. Cobb's uncle and namesake, also Howell Cobb, had been a U.S. Congressman from 1807 to 1812, and then served as an officer in the War of 1812.

Cobb's younger brother, Thomas Reade Rootes Cobb, was also a politician and soldier and was killed in the Civil War. Thomas Willis Cobb, a member of the United States Congress and namesake of Georgia's Cobb County, was a cousin. His niece Mildred Lewis "Miss Millie" Rutherford was a prominent educator, white supremacy advocate, and leader in the United Daughters of the Confederacy. Howell Cobb's daughter, Mary Ann Lamar Cobb Erwin, was responsible for creating the United Daughters of the Confederacy's Southern Cross of Honor in 1899, which was awarded to Confederate Veterans. His son, Andrew J. Cobb, served as a justice of the Georgia Supreme Court.

== See also ==
- List of signers of the Georgia Ordinance of Secession
- List of American Civil War generals (Confederate)

== Notes ==
U.S. House of Representatives
Preceded by James Meriwether	Member of the U.S. House of Representatives from Georgia's at-large congressional district Seat 5; 1843–1845	Constituency abolished
New constituency	Member of the U.S. House of Representatives from Georgia's 6th congressional district 1845–1851	Succeeded by Junius Hillyer
Preceded by Junius Hillyer	Member of the U.S. House of Representatives from Georgia's 6th congressional district 1855–1857	Succeeded by James Jackson
Political offices
Preceded by Robert Winthrop	Speaker of the United States House of Representatives; 1849–1851	Succeeded by Linn Boyd
Preceded by George Towns	Governor of Georgia; 1851–1853	Succeeded by Herschel Johnson
Preceded by James Guthrie	United States Secretary of the Treasury; 1857–1860	Succeeded by Philip Thomas
New office	President of the Confederate States Provisional Congress; 1861–1862	Position abolished
Party political offices
Preceded by Edward Hill; Whig	Constitutional Union nominee for Governor of Georgia; 1851	Succeeded by Charles J. Jenkins
