= Chappelle Matthews =

American politician (1908–1986)

Member of the Georgia House of Representatives
- In office January 10, 1949 – January 10, 1977
- Preceded by: Jack R. Wells
- Succeeded by: Bob Argo
- Constituency: Clarke County (1949–1966); 29th district (1966–1969); 16th district (1966–1969); 62nd district (1973–1975); 63rd district (1975–1977)

Personal details
- Born: Robert Chappelle Matthews; November 1, 1908; Athens, Georgia, U.S.
- Died: November 9, 1986 (aged 78); Athens, Georgia, U.S.
- Resting place: Oconee Hill Cemetery
- Political party: Democratic
- Spouses: Ida Holt Touchstone (m. 1944, divorced); Dorothy Louise Harris Wall (m. 1965)
- Education: University of Georgia; Southern Law School (LLB)
- Occupation: Lawyer; politician

Robert Chappelle Matthews (November 1, 1908 – November 9, 1986) was an American lawyer and politician who served in the Georgia House of Representatives from 1949 to 1977. At the time of his retirement, he was the house's dean, its longest serving member. A resident of Athens, Georgia, home of the University of Georgia, he was a longtime supporter of higher education in the state, serving as chair of the Committee on the University System of Georgia for most of his time in the legislature. The University of Georgia's R. Chappelle Matthews Public Service Complex is named in Matthews's honor and contains a sculpture of him, which was dedicated in 2011. Matthews died on November 9, 1986, in Athens, and was buried in Oconee Hill Cemetery.
