= Young Harris =

American politician

Young L. G. Harris
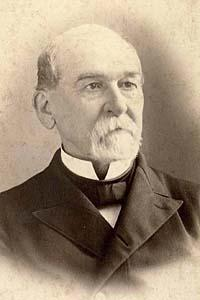
- Born: 1812; Elbert County, Georgia
- Died: April 28, 1894 (aged 82); Athens, Georgia
- Occupations: Lawyer, Businessman, Politician, Judge, Philanthropist
- Spouse: Susan Bevel Allen
- Parent(s): Walton Harris & Virginia Beverly Billups

Young Loftin Gerdine Harris (1812 – April 28, 1894) was an American lawyer, businessman, politician, judge, and philanthropist. He is best known as the early benefactor of Young Harris College in the U.S. state of Georgia, after whom the school was named.

== Biography ==
Harris was born in Elbert County, Georgia, in the middle of Walton Harris and Virginia Beverly Billup's 8 children. His exact birthday is unknown, and it was not included on his headstone. Primary education was obtained in the common schools, then he attended the University of Georgia.

Harris was admitted to the Georgia Bar in 1834 and began his law practice in Elberton, Georgia, where he was quite successful and represented Elbert County in the state legislature. He and his wife moved to Athens in 1840. He became well known and was elected to the Georgia House of Representatives from Clarke County in 1841 and from 1847 to 1852. He was also a delegate to the 1865 convention that drafted the 1868 Constitution of Georgia. Harris was appointed as judge of the Inferior Court of Athens In 1850, Harris owned seventeen slaves in Athens, Georgia. Harris was one of a group of Athens businessmen who founded the profitable Southern Mutual Fire Insurance Company in 1847. He was initially named Secretary and Principal Director where he proved his financial skill by smart management of the company's assets. Harris was company president from 1866 until his death, and the business became one of the largest in the southeast United States. Susan Bevel Allen, whose family worked a plantation, married Harris in 1835. The couple had no children. She died on May 18, 1888, at age 70 after 53 years together.

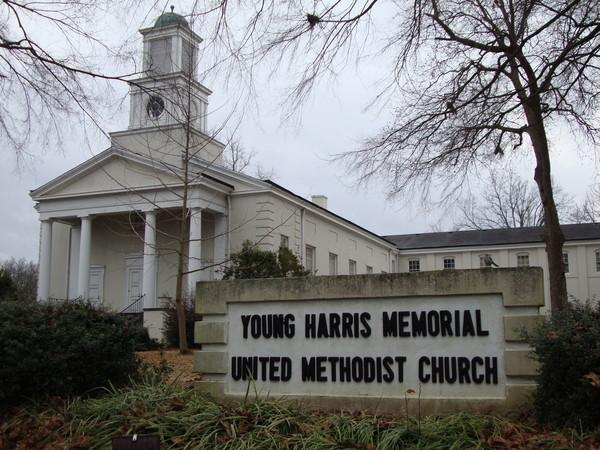
Young Harris Memorial Church

=== Death and afterward ===
In the spring of 1893, Harris suffered a serious illness from which he never completely recovered. He died in 1894 and was buried at Oconee Hill Cemetery in Athens. His funeral was well attended, indicating the respect and admiration he had earned.

On January 3, 1909, 112 members founded a new church in Athens. Land was donated by the Reverend Joe Dunaway, with the stipulation that it be named in honor of Judge Young L. G. Harris, who had provided friendship and assistance to Dunaway during his college years. The Young Harris Memorial United Methodist Church of Athens celebrated their centennial in 2009.

== Philanthropy ==
When Harris and his wife joined the First Methodist Church of Athens, it changed their lives and the lives of countless others who benefited from their generosity. Harris became a devout member, served as church superintendent for many years, and supported Methodism throughout the state. His income from Southern Mutual, legal work and judge's salary was substantial, exceeding $10,000 per year. That would be equivalent to $2.29 million today, using the nominal GDP per capita formula. He used his wealth to make numerous contributions to small churches, helped build minister's homes, and supported the Young Men's Christian Association.

Harris served as a member of the Board of Trustees for Emory College, and donated two buildings: the Marvin Dormitory and the President's Home.

The Harris-Allen Library was established at Elberton, Georgia in his wife's honor with a gift of $6,000, $1.38 million in 2010 dollars.

=== Young Harris College ===
In 1886, Circuit-riding Methodist minister Artemas Lester started a school at the small community of McTyeire, Georgia, named after Bishop Holland McTyeire. The goal of the McTyeire Institute was to provide rural Appalachian Mountain children in north Georgia with an opportunity for an education. Lester wrote to Judge Harris, asking for a $100 loan, which was promptly granted. Zell Miller, Young Harris' most famous native, wrote a history of the school and town. He commented, "Young L. G. Harris was a big Methodist church member and didn't have time to come and look at this school in the Brasstown valley, so he sent his associate, a Mr. Thomas, who looked it over and liked the idea." After hearing positive things about the school, Harris resolved to increase his support of the institution. Harris funded the construction of the campus for $20,000, ($4.27 million in 2010 dollars) then continued to contribute several thousand dollars each year.

The school's name was changed in 1888 from McTyeire Institute to Young Harris Institute in honor of his strong financial support. Within the next three years it was changed again, to Young L. G. Harris College, and the United States Post Office Department was petitioned to change the name of the community as well. The initials were dropped over time to simply, Young Harris College.

Susan B. Harris Chapel in the 1900s

In 1892, a few years after the death of his wife, he donated $4,000 (worth $762,000 today). to construct the Susan B. Harris Chapel on the McTyeire campus in her memory. The brick structure contains a bell tower and was home to the local Methodist congregation until a new facility was built in 1949. It is the oldest building on the YHC campus and was most recently renovated in 2009. As of 2011, the structure was used for vespers, lectures, concerts and homecoming.

Provision for the school was included in Harris' will, even though he never saw the campus. However, dozens of family members contested the will, which was finally settled by the Supreme Court of Georgia in 1897 when the college received $16,000 of the $100,000 estate.

Arguably Harris' most lasting and significant achievement were his donations to McTiere Institute. An article in the Athens newspaper on May 1, 1894, stated:

Gifts to the school by Judge Harris, at times when they were most needed, established an institution that has shed abroad the light of religion and education and has given to the State of Georgia and to the world a priceless heritage of education and refinement nowhere exceeded. From the halls of Young Harris College, scores of youths have gone forth blessing his name, and their lives have brought honor to their state and country.

One U.S. Senator, two governors, and a number of congressmen, state legislators and mayors attended Young Harris College.

== Philosophical views ==
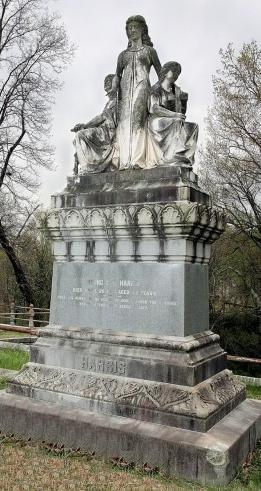
Young Harris tomb and monument

Young Harris did not talk about his charitable contributions because he was too modest. Even his close friends were not aware of the extent of his generosity. It was said "that little children delighted to crowd around him and hear from him the wondrous story of our Lord". The author of Harris' obituary in the Athens Weekly Banner quoted Harris just before he died: "I do not think the deeds of a man are near as important in a religious sense as those things he omits to do; and yet a man ought to feel thankful if it can be said of him after death, 'Here lies a blameless man'."

=== Monument ===
A provision of Harris' will requested that a monument be erected at his burial vault, costing between $1,500 and $2,000. Biographer Paul Paschal questioned why a modest man who lived simply and donated most of his income would request such an expensive and ornate decoration. The intricately carved figures of three robed women are mounted on top of the tomb. Close inspection identifies symbols, which reveal the figures to be the three Saints, Faith, Hope and Charity or the three Theological virtues.

The monument appears to be a message to those who visit his final resting place. They represent the principles that guided Harris' life, and he viewed them as the meaning of life.
