= Battle of Cheat Mountain order of battle =

The following Union Army and Confederate Army units and commanders fought in the Battle of Cheat Mountain of the American Civil War on September 12 and 13, 1861 in present-day West Virginia.

== Abbreviations used ==
=== Military rank ===
- Gen = General
- BG = Brigadier General
- Col = Colonel
- Ltc = Lieutenant Colonel
- Cpt = Captain

=== Other ===
- w = wounded
- k = killed

== Union Forces ==
=== Cheat Mountain District ===
BG Joseph J. Reynolds

Brigade	Unit
1st Brigade BG Joseph J. Reynolds	7th Indiana: Col Ebenezer Dumont; 9th Indiana: Col Robert H. Milroy; 13th Indiana: Col Jeremiah C. Sullivan; 14th Indiana: Col Nathan Kimball; 15th Indiana: Col George D. Wagner; 17th Indiana: Col Milo S. Hascall; 3rd Ohio: Col Isaac H. Marrow; 6th Ohio: Col William K. Bosley; 24th Ohio: Col Jacob Ammen; 25th Ohio: Col James A. Jones; 32nd Ohio: Col Thomas H. Ford; 2nd West Virginia: Col John W. Moss; 3rd West Virginia: Col David T. Hewes
Artillery	Rigby's Indiana Battery; 1st Michigan Artillery, Battery A; 12th Ohio Independent Battery; 4th U.S. Artillery, Battery G: Cpt Albion P. Howe; 1st West Virginia Artillery, Battery A
Cavalry	Bracken's Indiana Cavalry; 1st Ohio Cavalry, Company A; 1st Ohio Cavalry, Company C

== Confederate Forces ==
=== Army of the Northwest ===
Gen Robert E. Lee

Brigade	Unit
1st Brigade BG Henry R. Jackson	3rd Arkansas: Col Albert Rust; 23rd Virginia: Col Alexander Taliaferro; 25th Virginia; 31st Virginia: Col William L. Jackson
2nd Brigade BG Samuel R. Anderson	1st Tennessee: Col George Maney; 4th Tennessee; 16th Tennessee

== See also ==
- West Virginia in the American Civil War
