= Thomas R. R. Cobb =

American politician (1823–1862)

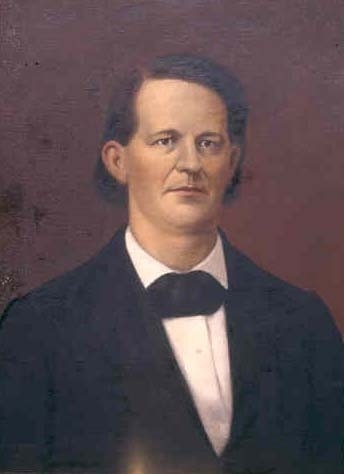
- T. R. R. Cobb by Horace James Bradley

Deputy from Georgia to the Provisional Congress of the Confederate States
- In office February 8, 1861 – February 17, 1862
- Preceded by: New creation
- Succeeded by: Position abolished

Personal details
- Born: Thomas Reade Rootes Cobb; April 10, 1823 Jefferson County, Georgia
- Died: December 13, 1862 (aged 39) Fredericksburg, Virginia
- Spouse: Marion Lumpkin
- Relations: Howell Cobb (brother); Sarah Johnson Cocke
- Children: 3 (surviving)
- Education: Franklin College

Military service
- Allegiance: Confederate States
- Branch/service: Confederate States Army
- Years of service: 1861–1862
- Rank: Brigadier General
- Commands: Cobb's Legion; Cobb's Brigade
- Battles/wars: American Civil War: Seven Days Battles; Battle of Malvern Hill; Battle of Fredericksburg †

Thomas Reade Rootes Cobb (April 10, 1823 – December 13, 1862), also known as T. R. R. Cobb, was an American lawyer, author, politician, and Confederate States Army officer, killed in the Battle of Fredericksburg during the American Civil War. He was the brother of noted Confederate statesman Howell Cobb.

== Early life, education and marriage ==
Cobb was born in 1823 in Jefferson County, Georgia, to John A. Cobb and Sarah (Rootes) Cobb. He was the younger brother of Howell Cobb. Cobb graduated in 1841 from Franklin College (present-day University of Georgia), where he was a member of the Phi Kappa Literary Society. He was admitted to the bar in 1842.

He married Marion Lumpkin, daughter of the Supreme Court of Georgia Chief Justice Joseph Henry Lumpkin. Only three of their children lived past childhood: Callender (Callie), who married Augustus Longstreet Hull; Sarah A. (Sally), who married Henry Jackson, the son of Henry Rootes Jackson; and Marion (Birdie), who married Michael Hoke Smith. The Lucy Cobb Institute, which he founded, was named for a daughter who died shortly before the school opened. His niece Mildred Lewis Rutherford served the school for over forty years in various capacities.

== Political career ==
From 1849 to 1857, he was a reporter of the Supreme Court of Georgia. He was an ardent secessionist, and was a delegate to the Secession Convention. He is best known for his treatise on the law of slavery titled An Inquiry into the Law of Negro Slavery in the United States of America (1858), published seventy-five years after the Quock Walker case attempting to refute the proposition that slavery is antithetical to natural law:

[T]his inquiry into the physical, mental, and moral development of the negro race seems to point them clearly, as peculiarly fitted for a laborious class. The physical frame is capable of great and long-continued exertion. Their mental capacity renders them incapable of successful self-development, and yet adapts them for the direction of the wiser race. Their moral character renders them happy, peaceful, contented and cheerful in a status that would break the spirit and destroy the energies of the Caucasian or the native American.

Cobb's Inquiry represented the capstone of proslavery legal thought and has been called one of the most comprehensive American proslavery treatise. It drew together examples from world history of slavery, which he used to argue that slavery was close to ubiquitous in human history and thus natural. He also drew on evidence of slavery's economic necessity and on then popular ideas of "science," which supported white supremacy and slavery.

Cobb was also one of the founders of the University of Georgia School of Law, and served on the first Georgia code commission of 1858 and drafted what became the private, penal, and civil law portions of the Georgia Code of 1861, which was the first successfully enacted attempt at a comprehensive codification of the common law anywhere in the United States. It is the ancestor of today's Official Code of Georgia Annotated. Simultaneously, the Northern law reformer David Dudley Field II was independently working in the same ambitious direction of trying to codify all of the common law into a coherent civil code, but Field's proposed civil code was not actually enacted until 1866 in Dakota Territory, was belatedly enacted in 1872 in California, and was repeatedly rejected several times by his home state of New York and never enacted in that state. Unlike Field's largely race-neutral code, the original Georgia Code was strongly biased in favor of slavery and white supremacy, and even contained a presumption that blacks were prima facie slaves until proven otherwise. Georgia ultimately kept the Code after the Civil War but revised it in 1867 and many more times since, to purge the racism and pro-slavery bias inherent in the original text. A long-standing item in the code was the "citizens' arrest law", which was added to the code in 1863 and remained unchanged until 2021 when the Georgia General Assembly curtailed the law

Cobb served in the Confederate Congress, where for a time he was chairman of the Committee on Military Affairs. He was also on the committee that was responsible for the drafting of the Confederate constitution.

== American Civil War ==
Cobb organized Cobb's Legion in the late summer of 1861 and was commissioned a colonel in the Confederate army on August 28, 1861. The Legion was assigned to the Army of Northern Virginia. It took heavy losses during the Maryland Campaign. He was promoted to brigadier general on November 1, 1862, but this promotion was not confirmed by the Confederate Congress.

== Death and legacy ==
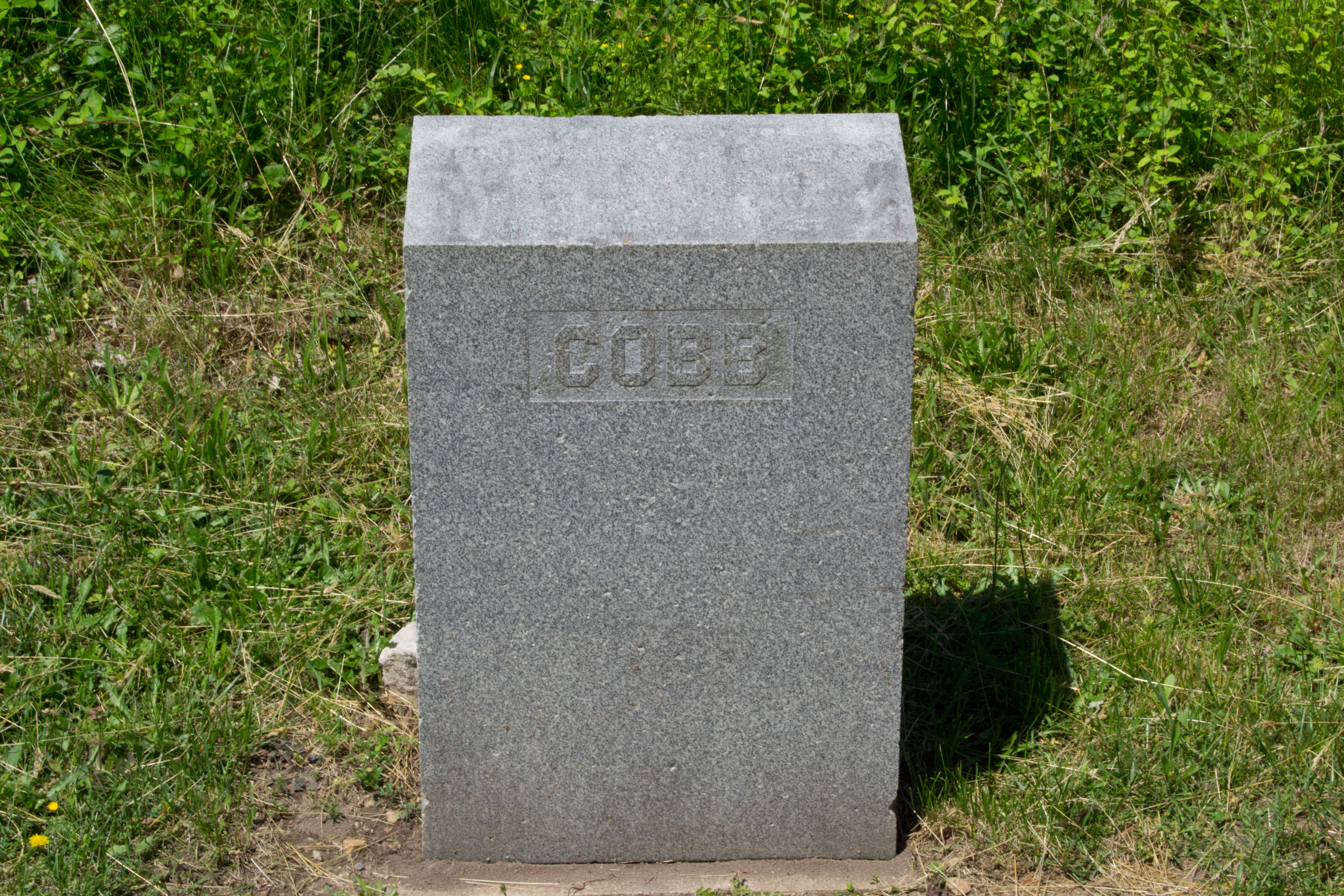
A marker on the side of the Sunken Road showing where Cobb was mortally wounded

At the Battle of Fredericksburg, he was mortally wounded in the thigh by a Union artillery shell that burst inside the Stephens house near the Sunken Road on Marye's Heights. He bled to death from damage to his femoral artery on December 13, 1862. Some later accounts by veterans claim that the wounding was by rifle fire and that a Confederate soldier may have been responsible. He is buried at Oconee Hill Cemetery in Athens, Georgia.

The T. R. R. Cobb House, where Thomas Cobb and his wife Marion lived in Athens is now a museum. Originally constructed across Prince Avenue from its current location, it was moved to Stone Mountain Park in Stone Mountain, Georgia, where it was partially reassembled about 1990. Stone Mountain Park had hoped to restore the house, but the project fell through. Then, it was transported back to Athens where it was reassembled and underwent an extensive restoration. The house is now an operational museum owned by the Watson-Brown Foundation.

== Works ==
- Digest of the Statute Laws of Georgia (1851)
- Inquiry into the Law of Negro Slavery in the United States (1858)
- Historical Sketch of Slavery, from the Earliest Periods (1859)
- The Code of the State of Georgia (1861) AKA The Code of 1863 because though published in 1861, the Georgia General Assembly did not pass it till 1863.
- The Code of the State of Georgia (1873)
- The Colonel (1897)

== See also ==
- List of American Civil War generals (Acting Confederate)
- List of American Civil War generals (Confederate)
- List of signers of the Georgia Ordinance of Secession

== Notes ==
Political offices
New creation	Deputy from Georgia to the Provisional Congress of the Confederate States; 1861–1862	Position abolished
