= Horace Moore Holden =

American judge

Horace Moore Holden (March 5, 1866 – February 7, 1936) was an American lawyer and judge who served as a justice of the Supreme Court of Georgia from 1907 to 1911.

== Early life and education ==
Horace Moore Holden was born on March 5, 1866, in Warren County, Georgia. His father was William Franklin Holden, "a prominent citizen of the county at that time". Holden became a student at the University of Georgia in the fall of 1883 and graduated in 1885.

== Legal and political career ==
On February 22, 1886, Holden was admitted to the bar in Taliaferro County, Georgia. On April 12, 1886, he began practicing law in Crawfordville, Georgia.

In 1894, Holden was elected as a Democratic nominee for a seat in the Georgia House of Representatives. He became a member of the state Democratic campaign committee in 1896, and a member of the Democratic executive committee for Georgia's 10th congressional district in 1900.

In 1900, Holden was elected judge of the Northern Judicial Circuit. In 1904, he was re-elected without opposition. In 1907, Holden was appointed by Governor M. Hoke Smith to become an associate justice of the Supreme Court of Georgia. Holden served on the Supreme Court of Georgia from 1907 to 1911.

== Personal life ==
On June 1, 1883, Holden married Mary Corry. Holden died in his home in Crawfordville, Georgia, at the age of 70, following a brief illness.

Political offices
Preceded by Andrew J. Cobb	Justice of the Supreme Court of Georgia; 1907–1911	Succeeded by H. Warner Hill
