= Oconee Hill Cemetery =

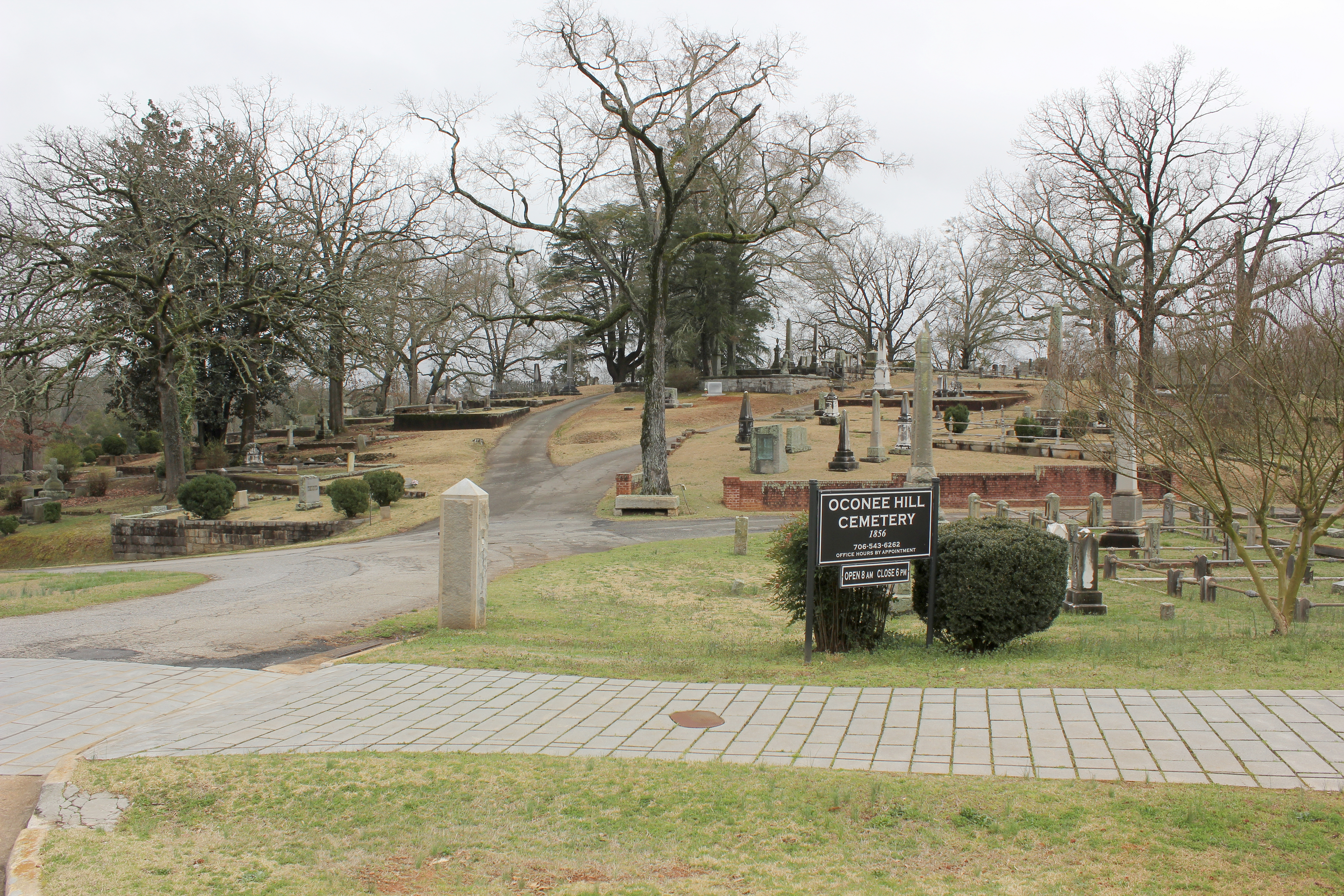
- Interactive map of Oconee Hill Cemetery

Details
- Established: 1856
- Location: Athens, Georgia
- Country: United States
- Coordinates: 33°56′52″N 83°21′59″W
- Website: Official website
- Find a Grave: Oconee Hill Cemetery

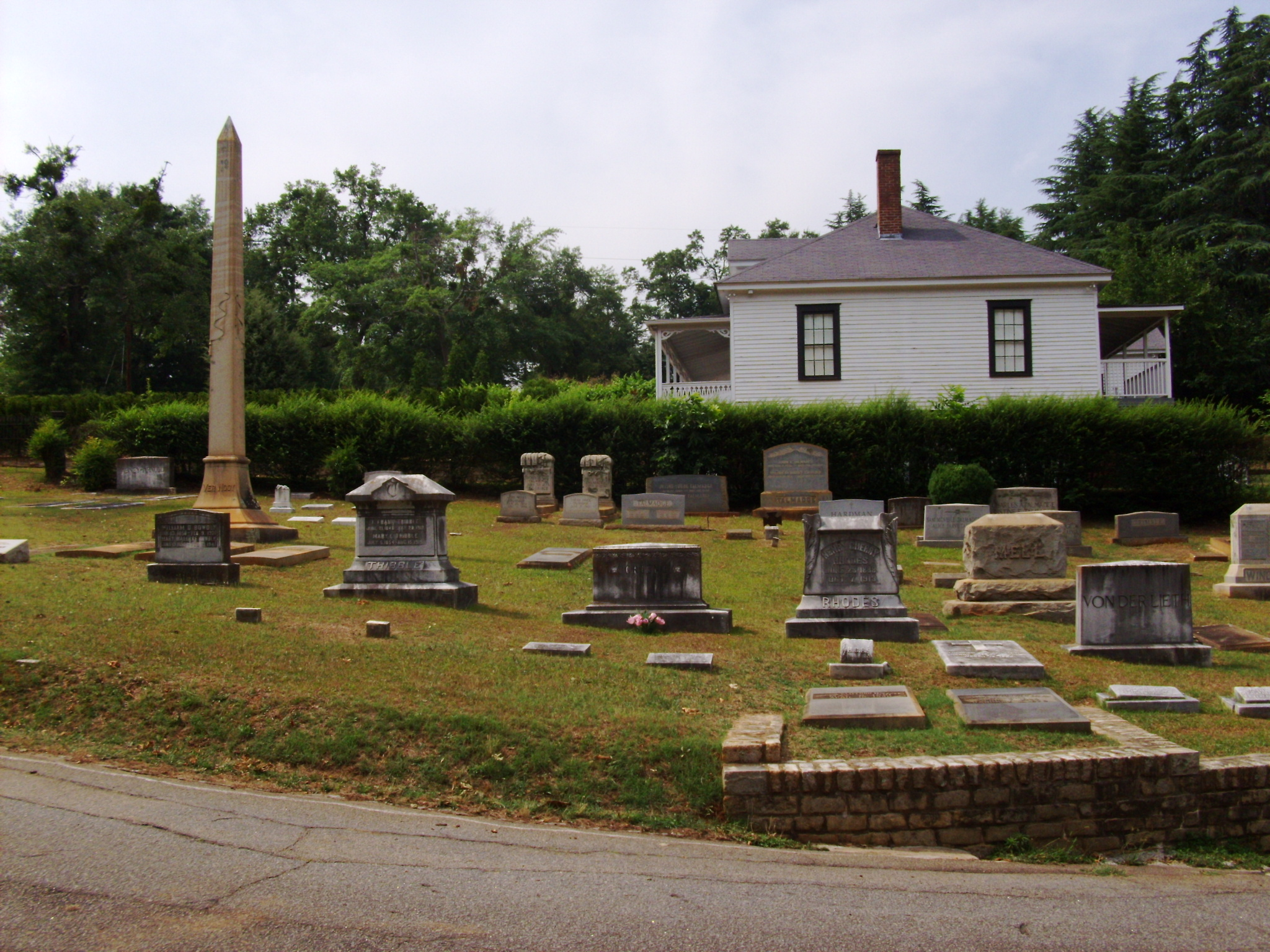
Entrance and groundskeeper's house, 2011

Oconee Hill Cemetery is a historic cemetery located in Athens, Georgia, near the University of Georgia. Established in 1856, it continues to serve as a burial ground and holds significant historical value for the community.

The city of Athens purchased the land for the cemetery in 1855 after burials were prohibited in the original Jackson Street Cemetery, which sits on property owned by the university. The following year, the city established a self-perpetuating Board of Trustees to manage the initial 17 acres (69,000 m^{2}) tract on the west bank of the North Oconee River, designating it as a public cemetery.

On May 22, 2013, Oconee Hill Cemetery was officially listed on the National Register of Historic Places.

== Notable interments ==
- Omer Clyde Aderhold, president of the University of Georgia.
- David Crenshaw Barrow Jr., chancellor (president) of the University of Georgia.
- William M. Browne, general in the Confederate States Army during the American Civil War.
- Frank Hardeman Brumby, United States Navy four-star admiral.
- Wally Butts, Georgia Bulldogs football head coach.
- Henry Hull Carlton, United States Representative for Georgia's 8th congressional district.
- Eve Carson, Student Leader from University of North Carolina, and homicide victim.
- Augustin Smith Clayton, United States Representative from Georgia.
- Howell Cobb, 23rd Speaker of the United States House of Representatives, Governor of Georgia, United States Secretary of the Treasury.
- Mary Ann Lamar Cobb (1818–1889), First Lady of Georgia
- Thomas Reade Rootes Cobb, Confederate general.
- Frederick Corbet Davison, president of the University of Georgia.
- Vince Dooley, former head coach of the Georgia Bulldogs and former athletic director of the University of Georgia.
- Ben T. Epps, known as "Georgia's First Aviator" and an American aviation pioneer.
- Mary Ann Cobb Erwin, originator of the Southern Cross of Honor
- Luther Glenn, Mayor of Atlanta from 1858 to 1860.
- Sampson Willis Harris, United States Representative for Alabama's 3rd congressional district and Alabama's 7th congressional district.
- Young L.G. Harris, Athens Judge, state representative and namesake of Young Harris College and Young Harris, Georgia
- Bill Hartman, former Georgia Bulldogs football player and coach and Washington Redskins player.
- Walter Barnard Hill, chancellor (president) of the University of Georgia.
- William Bailey Lamar, United States Representative for Florida's 3rd congressional district.
- Andrew A. Lipscomb, chancellor (president) of the University of Georgia.
- Crawford Long, physician noted for early use of diethyl ether as an anesthetic.
- Wilson Lumpkin, served two terms as the governor of Georgia, from 1831 to 1835
- Dan Magill, journalist and sports administrator
- Ann Orr Morris, Athens-born silversmith and jeweller.
- Tinsley W. Rucker Jr., United States Representative for Georgia's 8th congressional district.
- Dean Rusk, United States Secretary of State from 1961 to 1969 under presidents John F. Kennedy and Lyndon B. Johnson.
- Mildred Lewis Rutherford, historian general of the United Daughters of the Confederacy.
- Sophie Sosnowski, educator in Athens
- Lucy May Stanton, artist known for her portrait miniatures
- Robert Grier Stephens Jr., United States Representative for Georgia's 10th congressional district.
- May Erwin Talmadge, President General of the Daughters of the American Revolution
- Samuel Joelah Tribble, United States Representative for Georgia's 8th congressional district.
- Ricky Wilson, guitarist in the rock band The B-52's.
