= Southern Cross of Honor =

American medal for Confederate veterans (1899–1959)

- Obverse and reverse of the medal
- Awarded for: Honorable service in the Confederate States army, navy, or marine corps
- Date: 1899; 127 years ago
- Presented by: United Daughters of the Confederacy

The Southern Cross of Honor was a commemorative medal established in 1899 by the United Daughters of the Confederacy to honor Confederate veterans.

== Design ==
The Cross of Honor is in the form of a cross pattée suspended from a metal bar with space for engraving. It has no cloth ribbon. The obverse displays the Confederate battle flag placed on the center thereof surrounded by a wreath, with the inscription UNITED DAUGHTERS [of the] CONFEDERACY TO THE U. C. V. (the UCV is the United Confederate Veterans) on the four arms of the cross. The reverse of the Cross of Honor is the motto of the Confederate States, DEO VINDICE ([With] God [as] our Vindicator) and the dates 1861 1865 also surrounded by a laurel wreath. The arms of the cross bear the inscription SOUTHERN CROSS OF HONOR.

== History ==
Southern Cross of Honor

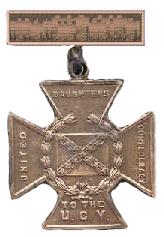
Obverse

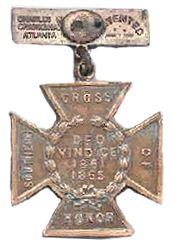
Reverse

In 1898, Mary Ann Cobb Erwin was the originator of the idea of a Cross of Honor; her father was the Confederate politician Howell Cobb. The suggestion was received by the United Daughters of the Confederacy (UDC) with enthusiasm and approval. At a meeting of the UDC at Hot Springs, Arkansas, in 1898, it took the assemblage by storm, and a committee was appointed by the President to develop designs. Mrs. Erwin preferred to remain in the background. She was placed on the committee, but withdrew. At the next annual meeting in Richmond, Virginia, the emblem proposed by Sarah E. Gabbett, of Atlanta, was adopted; while at the same time, the office of Custodian of the Cross of Honor was bestowed upon Gabbett. Miss Rutherford, of Athens, served in place of Mrs. Erwin on the committee. The other members were: Mrs. Sarah E. Gabbett and Mrs. Helen Plane, both of Atlanta. The committee was afterwards enlarged and given authority to formulate rules. When the idea was finally perfected, it was made to include not only veterans but also descendants of deceased Confederate soldiers and sailors. (Note: The writer's authority for these facts was two-fold: (1) The minutes of the ninth annual meeting of the United Daughters of the Confederacy, held at New Orleans, November 12-15, 1902; and (2) the resolutions adopted by the Cobb-Deloney Camp of Confederate Veterans, at Athens, Georgia, in May, 1900, published at the time and also reprinted in the Athens Banner of April 26, 1912.) In compliment to Mrs. Erwin, the first Cross of Honor bestowed by the UDC was awarded to her husband, Judge Alexander S. Erwin, of Athens, on April 26, 1900, by the Athens (Georgia) Chapter.

Charles W. Crankshaw of Atlanta, Georgia, was chosen as the contractor to produce the medal. Its first manufacturer was Schwaab Stamp & Seal Co. of Milwaukee, Wisconsin. In 1904 the contract was shifted to Whitehead & Hoag of Newark, New Jersey.

Anna Davenport Raines was the Custodian of Crosses of Honor until her death in 1913. Though intended to end in 1913, after the issuance of 78,761 medals, in 1912 it was extended indefinitely. The program finally ended in 1959.

== Eligibility and allocation ==
The Cross of Honor could only be bestowed through the United Daughters of the Confederacy. It could not be purchased; it was given in recognition of loyal, honorable service to the South and only a Confederate veteran could wear it. It was available to any branch of the Confederate military. Only living veterans were eligible. However the final award was given posthumously, in 1951 to Rear Adm. Raphael Semmes. At least 78,761 were awarded.

Although no Civil War veterans are still living, the last verified Confederate veteran dying in 1951, Virginia Code section 18.2-176(b) remains in effect and makes it a Class 3 misdemeanor, punishable by a fine of not more than US$500, to "wear any Southern Cross of Honor when not entitled to do so by the regulations under which such Crosses of Honor are given." An unofficial analog of the Union's GAR Medal, its wearing was never authorized on U.S. military uniforms.

== Headstones and markers ==
The Cross of Honor is also used as an emblem or marker on the graves of Confederate veterans. It will only be issued by the Department of Veterans Affairs to be placed on graves of Confederate veterans.

== Gallery ==
The Southern Cross of Honor

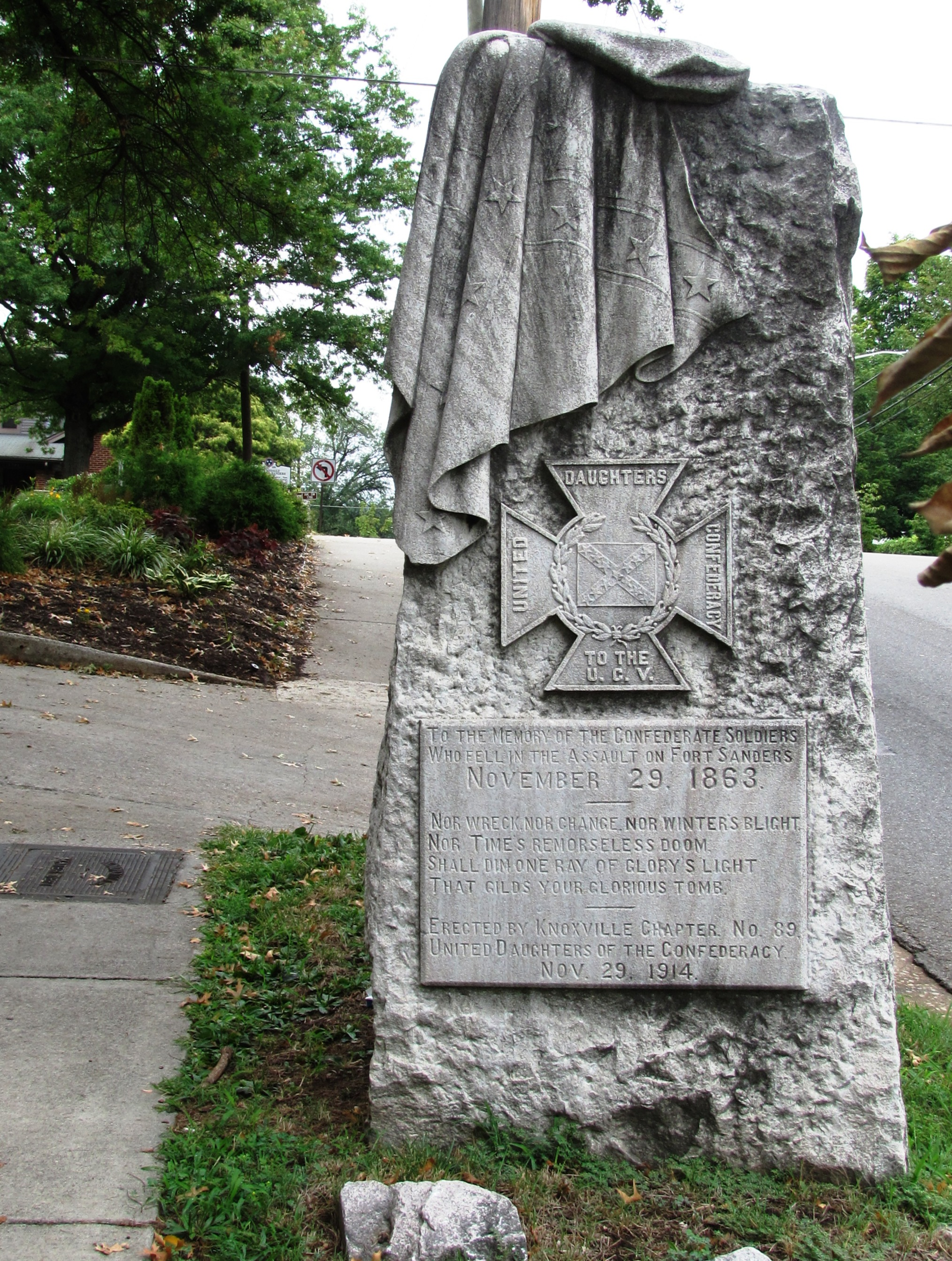
Southern Cross of Honor monument alongside Seventeenth Street in Knoxville, Tennessee

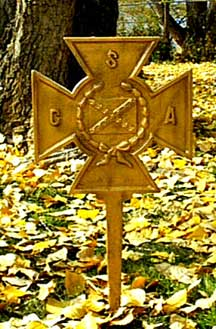
Historical United Daughters of the Confederacy Southern Cross of Honor marker

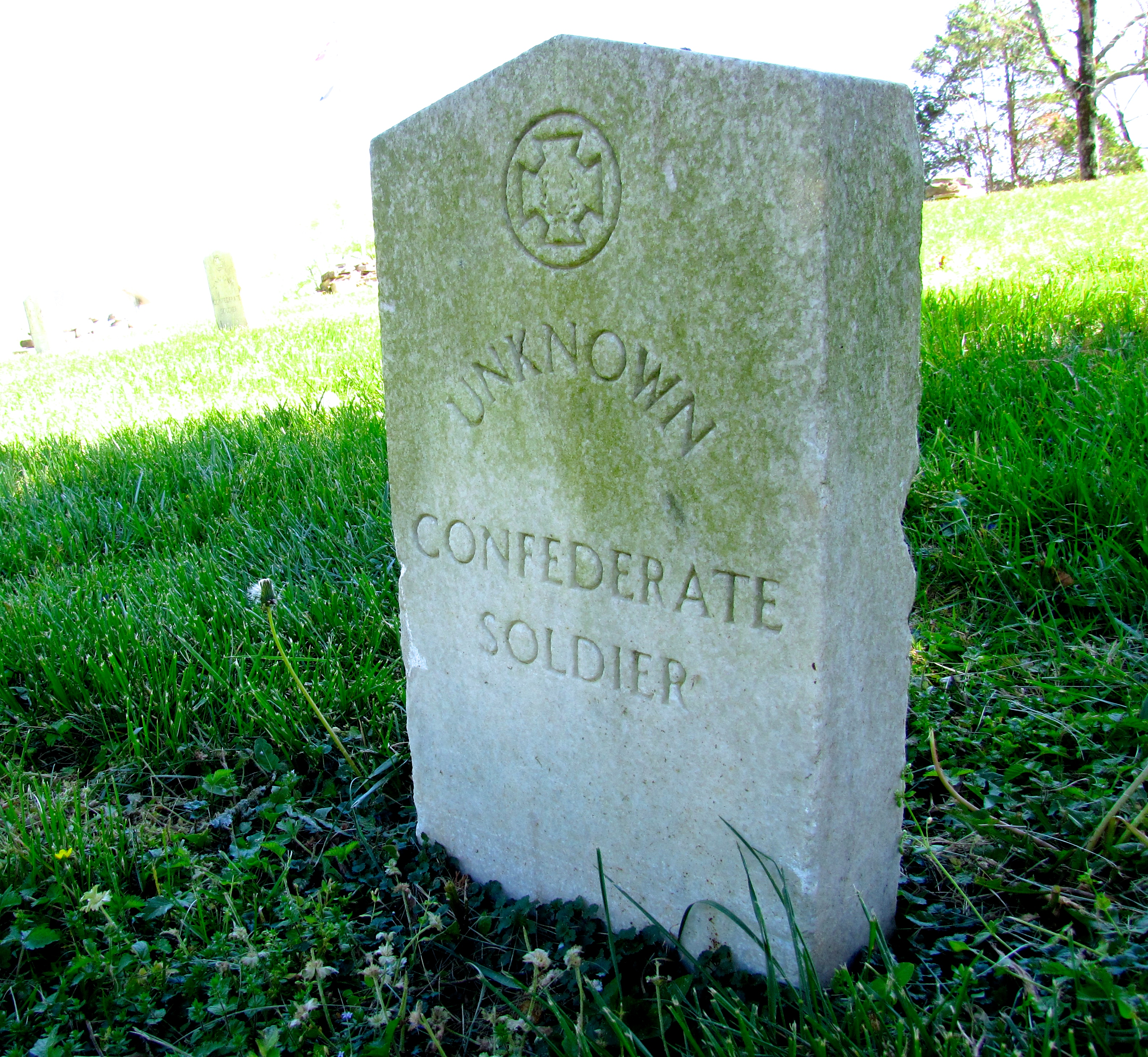
Standard government headstone for unknown Confederate soldier with a Southern Cross of Honor emblem in Beechgrove, Tennessee

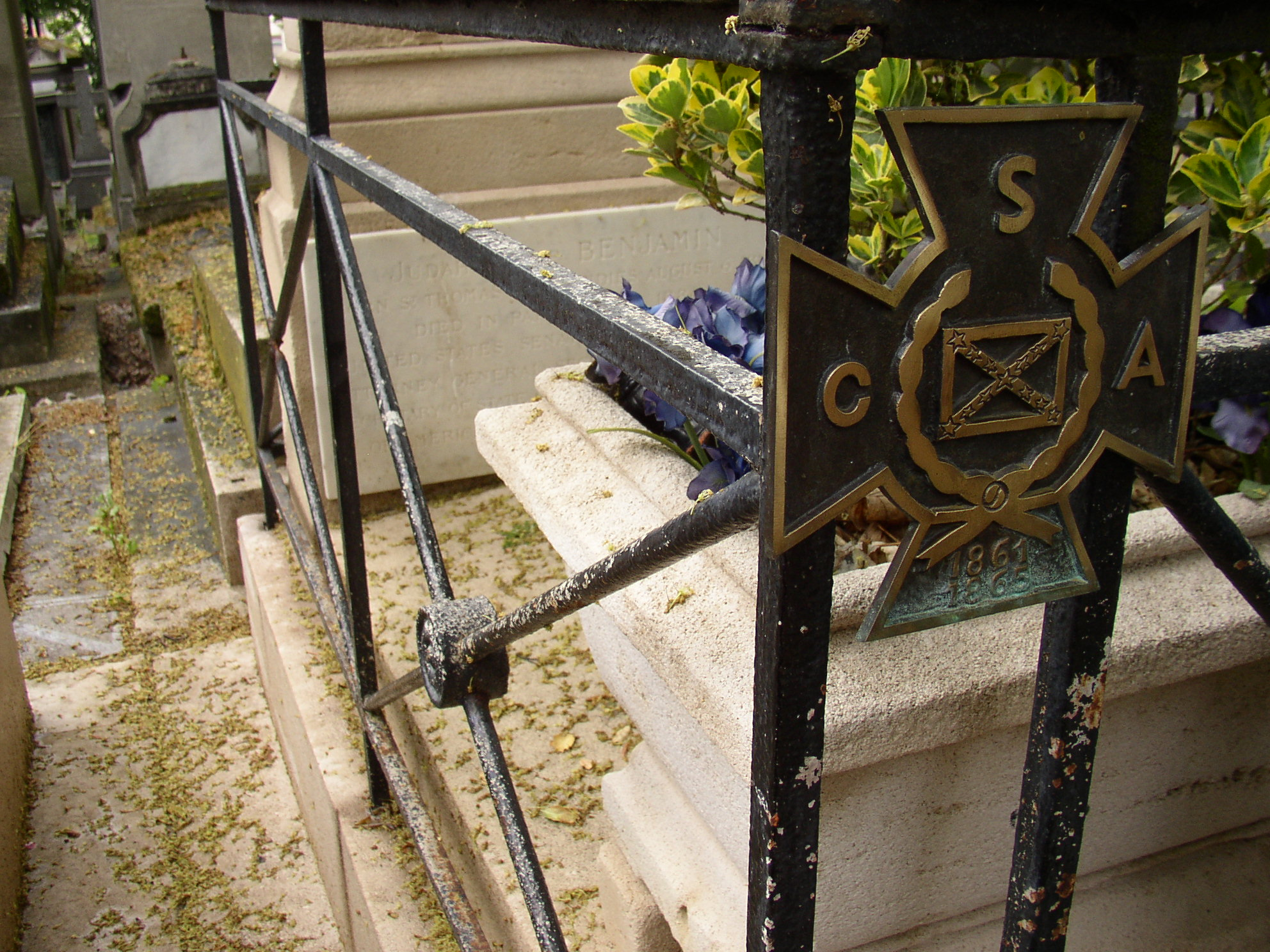
Sons of Confederate Veterans Southern Cross of Honor marker at the grave of Confederate States Secretary of State Judah Philip Benjamin at the Père Lachaise Cemetery in Paris, France

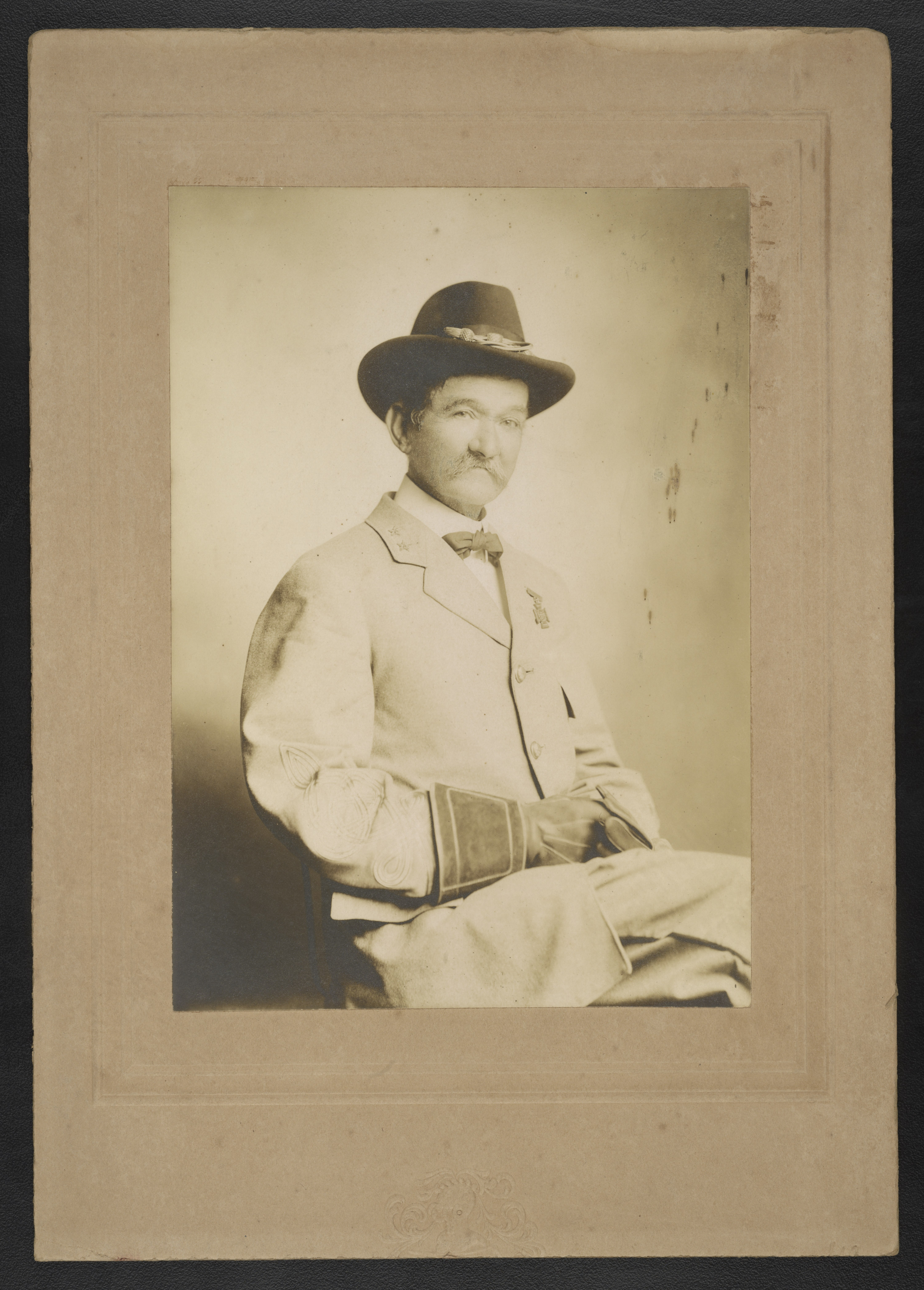
Civil War veteran in United Confederate Veterans (UCV) uniform wearing a Southern Cross of Honor

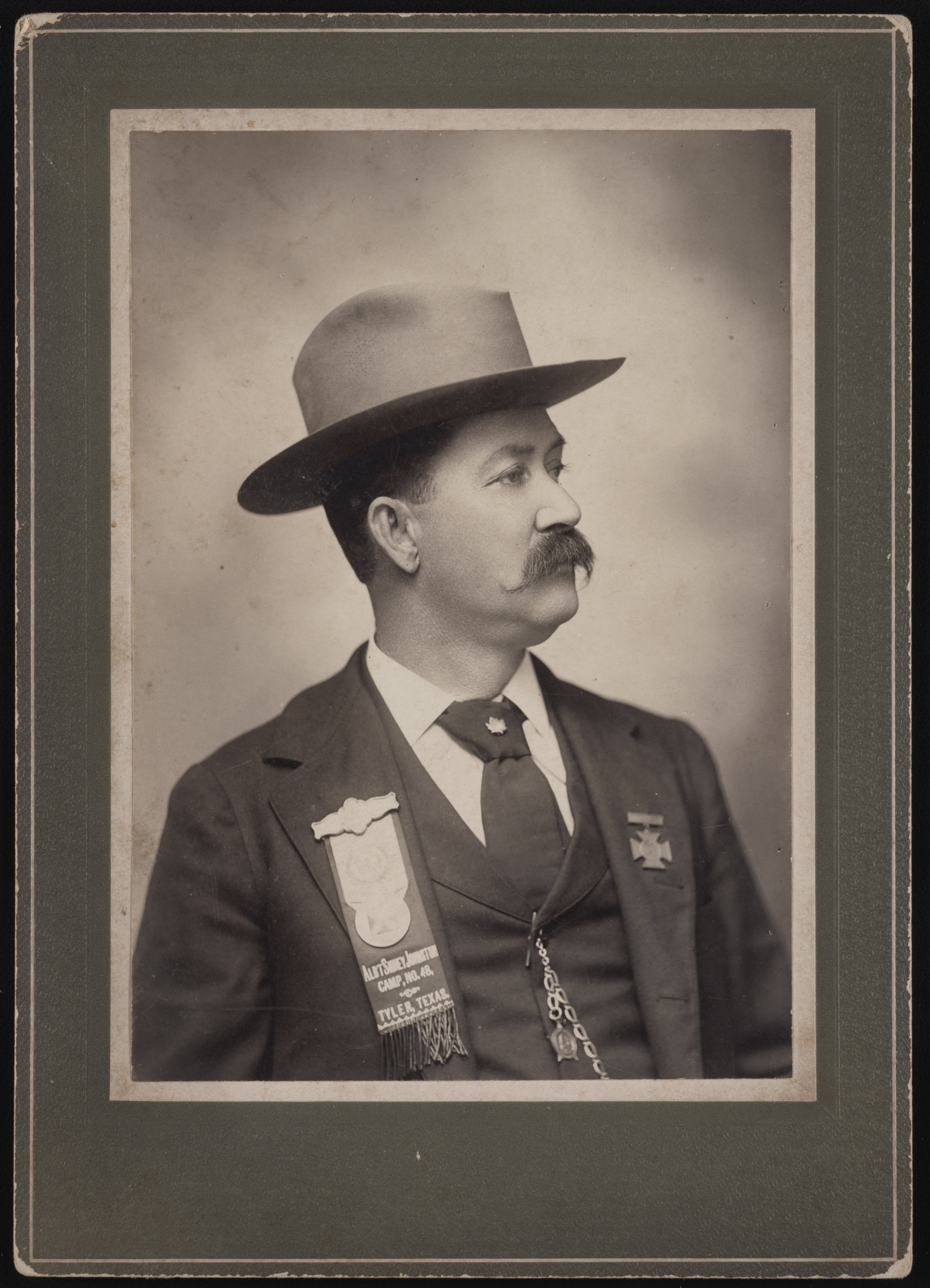
Member of Albert Sidney Johnston Camp, No. 48, UCV, Tyler, Texas, wearing a Southern Cross of Honor

== See also ==
- Lists of awards
- Cross Patee
