= Andrew J. Cobb =

American judge (1857–1925)

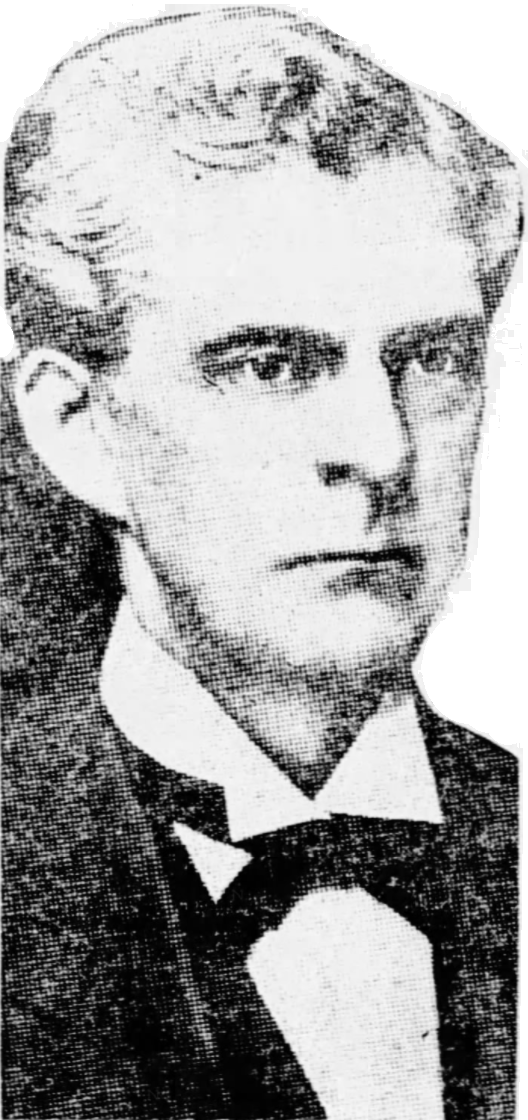
Judge Andrew J. Cobb

Andrew Jackson Cobb (April 12, 1857 – March 27, 1925) was a Georgia lawyer and educator who served as a justice of the Supreme Court of Georgia from 1897 to 1907.

At the time of Cobb's birth, his father, Howell Cobb, was a former governor of Georgia serving as the 22nd United States Secretary of the Treasury. His mother, Mary Ann Lamar Cobb, was from a prominent Southern family. Cobb was educated at the University of Georgia, where he received an A.B. in 1876 and an LL.D. in 1877. On August 12, 1877, Cobb was admitted to the bar, and practiced in Georgia except in the time he was serving in public office. From 1884 to 1893 he was a member of the Lumpkin Law faculty, and from 1893 until 1897, he was dean of the Atlanta Law school. On December 16, 1896, pursuant to a constitutional restructuring of the state supreme court, Cobb was elected to the court as a Democrat, along with Samuel Lumpkin, William A. Little, and William H. Fish, all elected "practically without opposition". Cobb took office in 1897 and served until 1907. From 1905 until he resigned, he was presiding justice of the second division of the state supreme court. He also was judge of the Western circuit of the superior court, which office he also resigned. He thereafter resumed his faculty position as chair of constitutional law at Lumpkin.

He served on the Athens board of education and was a trustee of Lucy Cobb institute, a school for girls in Athens founded by his uncle. He also was a member of the boards of the State Normal school and the Georgia Medical college, deacon emeritus of the First Baptist church and member of the executive committee of the Georgia Baptist convention. During and after World War I, Cobb was "one of Woodrow Wilson's staunchest supporters", and a strong proponent of the League of Nations.

Cobb was in ill health for several years before his death, and while he was forced to cease activity as a member of the various bodies, both secular and religious. He died in a hospital where he was taken following an attack of angina pectoris on a downtown street.

Political offices
Preceded by Newly reconfigured court	Justice of the Supreme Court of Georgia; 1897–1907	Succeeded by Horace Moore Holden
