= Cobb (surname) =

Cobb is an English surname of Anglo-Saxon/Old Norse origin.

== Notable people with the surname "Cobb" include ==
=== A ===
- Abbie Cobb (born 1985), American actress
- Agnes Egan Cobb (1877–1963), American businesswoman
- Alex Cobb (born 1987), American baseball player
- Alf Cobb (1892–1974), American football player
- Alice Cobb (born 1995), British cyclist
- Alice Culler Cobb (1843-1918), American educator, missionary
- Amasa Cobb (1823–1905), American politician
- Andrew R. Cobb (1876–1943), Canadian-American architect
- Arnett Cobb (1918–1989), American saxophonist
- Artie Cobb (born 1942), American poker player

=== B ===
- Betty Reynolds Cobb (1884–1956), American attorney
- Billy Cobb (born 1940), English footballer
- Brent Cobb (born 1986), American musician
- Britt Cobb, American politician
- Buff Cobb (1927–2010), American actress

=== C ===
- Calvin Cobb (1853–1928), American newspaper publisher
- Camilla Cobb (1843–1933), American teacher
- Catherine Cobb (1903–1995), British jeweler
- Charles Cobb (disambiguation), multiple people
- Charley Cobb (born 1929/1930), American football coach
- Chester Francis Cobb (1899–1943), Australian-English novelist
- Chris Cobb (born 1964), British computer scientist
- Clinton L. Cobb (1842–1879), American politician
- Craig Cobb (born 1951), American activist
- Curt Cobb (born 1971), American politician
- Cyril Cobb (1861–1938), British barrister
- Cyrus Cobb (1834–1903), American lawyer

=== D ===
- Darius Cobb (1834–1919), American painter
- Daryl Cobb (born 1961), American author
- Dave Cobb (born 1974), American record producer
- David Cobb (disambiguation), multiple people
- DeAndra' Cobb (born 1981), American football player
- Denise LeClair Cobb, American anchor

=== E ===
- Ed Cobb (1938–1999), American musician
- Edmund Cobb (1892–1974), American actor
- Edward Cobb (disambiguation), multiple people
- Elijah Cobb (1769–1848), American sea captain
- Elisabeth Cobb (1902–1959), American writer
- Ellen Cobb (born 1940), British judoka
- Enoch Cobb (1797–1876), American businessman
- Eunice Hale Waite Cobb (1803–1880), American writer
- Evelyn Hey Cobb (1899–1972), British army officer

=== F ===
- Fiona Cobb, British engineer
- Frank I. Cobb (1869–1923), American journalist
- Frederick Cobb (1901–1950), English politician
- Freeman Cobb (1830–1878), American businessman

=== G ===
- Gail Cobb (1950–1974), American policewoman
- Garry Cobb (born 1957), American football player
- Gary Cobb (born 1968), English footballer
- Gavin Cobb (born 1998), Canadian football player
- George Cobb (disambiguation), multiple people
- Gerald Cobb (1900–1986), English artist
- Gerard Francis Cobb (1838–1904), English organist
- Granger Cobb (1960–2015), American businessman
- Guy Cobb (born 1963), American artist and entrepreneur

=== H ===
- Hannah Cobb, British archaeologist
- Helena Maud Brown Cobb (1869–1922), American missionary
- Henry Cobb (disambiguation), multiple people
- Herb Cobb (1904–1980), American baseball player
- Howell Cobb (disambiguation), multiple people
- Hubbard Cobb (1917–2006), American writer
- Humphrey Cobb (1899–1944), Canadian-American screenwriter
- Humphry Cobb (1873–1949), English cricketer

=== I ===
- Irvin S. Cobb (1876–1944), American author
- Isabel Cobb (1858–1947), American educator
- Ivorey Cobb (1911–1992), American publisher

=== J ===
- Jack Cobb (1904–1966), American basketball player
- James Cobb (disambiguation), multiple people
- Janine O'Leary Cobb (born 1933), Canadian activist
- Jeff Cobb (born 1982), American professional wrestler
- Jelani Cobb (born 1969), American writer
- Jennie Ross Cobb (1881–1959), American photographer
- Jennifer Jo Cobb (born 1973), American race car driver
- Jeremiah Cobb (born 2004), American football player
- Jerrie Cobb (1931–2019), American aviator
- Jewel Plummer Cobb (1924–2017), American biologist
- Jia M. Cobb (born 1980), American attorney
- Jim Cobb, American politician
- Jimmy Cobb (1929–2020), American drummer
- Jodi Cobb, American photographer
- Joe Cobb (disambiguation), multiple people
- John Cobb (disambiguation), multiple people
- Joseph B. Cobb (1819–1858), American writer and politician
- Josh Cobb (born 1990), English cricketer
- Joyce Cobb (born 1945), American singer
- J. R. Cobb (1944–2019), American guitarist
- Julie Cobb (born 1947), American actress
- June Cobb (1927–2015), American intelligence officer
- Junie Cobb (1896–1970), American musician
- Justin Cobb, British surgeon

=== K ===
- Kay B. Cobb (1942–2023), American judge
- Keith Hamilton Cobb (born 1962), American actor
- Kevin Cobb, American musician
- Kim Cobb (born 1974), American scientist

=== L ===
- Laura M. Cobb (1892–1981), American nurse
- Lawrence Cobb (1894–1945), American politician
- Lee J. Cobb (1911–1976), American actor
- Leonie Cobb (1912–1984), British conservationist
- Linda Cobb (born 1950), American journalist
- Lorenza Cobb (1888–1953), American baseball player
- Lyman Cobb (1800–1864), American author

=== M ===
- Madeleine Cobb (born 1940), British sprinter
- Margaret C. Cobb (1892–1975), American geologist
- Margaret V. Cobb (1884–1963), American psychologist
- Marvin Cobb (born 1953), American football player
- Mary Ann Lamar Cobb (1818–1889), American civic leader
- Mary E. Cobb (1852–1902), American manicurist
- Mason Cobb (born 2001), American football player
- Matthew Cobb (born 1957), British zoologist
- Maud Barker Cobb (1872–1925), American politician
- Melanie Cobb, American biochemist
- Michael Cobb (born 1945), Australian politician
- Michael Cobb (railway historian) (1916–2010), British historian
- Mike Cobb (born 1955), American football player
- Monica Geike Cobb (1891–1946), English barrister

=== N ===
- Nathan Cobb (1859–1932), American zoologist
- Ned Cobb (1885–1973), American farmer
- Nelson Cobb (1811–1894), American judge
- Noah Cobb (born 2004), American soccer player
- Noel Cobb (1938–2015), American philosopher
- Norah Marjorie Cobb (1899–1991), English toy maker
- Norvell P. Cobb (1824–1879), American army officer

=== O ===
- Omari Cobb (born 1997), American football player
- Oscar Cobb, American architect
- Osro Cobb (1904–1996), American lawyer and politician

=== P ===
- Patrick Cobb, American army officer
- Paul M. Cobb (born 1967), American historian
- Price Cobb (born 1954), American race car driver

=== R ===
- Randall Cobb (disambiguation), multiple people
- Rebecca Cobb, British illustrator
- Reggie Cobb (1968–2019), American football player
- Regina Cobb, American politician
- Richard Cobb (1917–1996), British historian
- Rob Cobb (born 1999), New Zealand rugby union footballer
- Robert Cobb (disambiguation), multiple people
- Ron Cobb (1937–2020), American cartoonist
- Rufus W. Cobb (1829–1913), American politician
- Russell Cobb (born 1961), English cricketer

=== S ===
- Samuel Cobb (disambiguation), multiple people
- Sara Miranda Maxson Cobb (1858–1917), American teacher
- Seth Wallace Cobb (1838–1909), American politician
- Stanley Cobb (1887–1968), American neurologist
- Stanwood Cobb (1881–1982), American educator
- Stephen Cobb (disambiguation), multiple people
- Sue Cobb (disambiguation), multiple people
- Silas B. Cobb (1812–1900), American industrialist
- Silvanus Cobb (1709–1762), English naval officer
- Sylvanus Cobb Jr. (1823–1887), American writer

=== T ===
- Thomas Cobb (disambiguation), multiple people
- Tim Cobb (born 1964), American musician
- Trevor Cobb (born 1970), American football player
- Ty Cobb (1886–1961), American baseball player
- Ty Cobb (attorney) (born 1950), American lawyer
- Ty Cobb (politician) (born 1975), American politician in Nevada, son of Tyrus
- Tyrus W. Cobb (1940–2024), American lieutenant colonel and academic, specialized in national security

=== W ===
- Wally Cobb (1870–1933), Australian rugby union footballer
- Walt Cobb (born 1944), Canadian politician
- Weldon J. Cobb, American author
- Wilbur Cobb (disambiguation), multiple people
- Will D. Cobb (1876–1930), American lyricist and composer
- William Cobb (disambiguation), multiple people
- Williamson Robert Winfield Cobb (1807–1864), American politician
- Willie Cobb, American baseball player

=== Z ===
- Zita Cobb (born 1958), Canadian businesswoman

== Fictional characters ==
- Dom Cobb, protagonist of the film Inception (2010)
- Frank Cobb, a character in the comic series Cobb: Off the Leash
- Jayne Cobb, a character in the TV series Firefly (2002} and the film Serenity (2005)

== See also ==
- Cob (disambiguation), a disambiguation page for "Cob"
- Cobbe, a page for people with the surnamed Cobbe
- Cobbs, a page for people with the surnamed Cobbs
- Cobby, a page for people with the surnamed Cobby
- Judge Cobb (disambiguation), a disambiguation page for Judges surnamed "Cobb"
- Justice Cobb (disambiguation), a disambiguation page for Justices surnamed "Cobb"
- General Cobb (disambiguation), a disambiguation page for Generals surnamed "Cobb"
- Governor Cobb (disambiguation), a disambiguation page for Governors surnamed "Cobb"
- Senator Cobb (disambiguation), a disambiguation page for Senators surnamed "Cobb"
