= Charles Cobb =

Charles Cobb may refer to:

- Charles Cobb (cricketer) (1863–1922), English cricketer
- Charles Cobb (economist) (1875–1949), American mathematician and economist
- Charles E. Cobb (born 1936), American businessman
- Charles E. Cobb Jr. (born 1943), journalist, professor and former activist
- Charles G. Cobb (born 1945), American author, management expert and lecturer
- Charles Cobb (American football), American football player and coach
- Charley Cobb, American football coach
- Charlie Cobb, athletic director for Georgia State University

== See also ==
- Charles Cobbe (1686–1765), Primate of Ireland
- Cobb (surname)
