= Cobb =

Cobb may refer to:

== People ==
- Cobb (surname), a list of people and fictional characters with the surname Cobb
- Cobb Rooney (1900–1973), American professional football running back

== Places ==
=== New Zealand ===
- Cobb River
- Cobb Reservoir
- Cobb Power Station

=== United Kingdom ===
- The Cobb, the harbour wall in Lyme Regis, England

=== United States ===
- Cobb, California, a census designated place
- Cobb, former name of Pine Grove, Lake County, California
- Cobb Mountain, California
- Cobb County, Georgia
- Cobb, Georgia, an unincorporated community
- Cobb, Indiana, an unincorporated town
- Cobb, Kentucky, an unincorporated community
- Cobb, Oklahoma, an unincorporated community
- Cobb Peak (Idaho)
- Cobb Peak, Tooele County, Utah
- Cobb River (Minnesota)
- Cobb, St. Clair County, Missouri, an unincorporated community
- Cobb, Stoddard County, Missouri, an unincorporated community
- Cobb, Texas, an unincorporated community
- Mount Cobb, Washington County, Vermont, Vermont
- Cobb Town, Wisconsin, an unincorporated community
- Cobb, West Virginia, an unincorporated community
- Cobb, Wisconsin, a village
- Fort Cobb, a US Army fort established in 1859 in what is now Caddo County, Oklahoma

=== Elsewhere ===
- Mount Cobb (British Columbia), Canada
- Cobb Seamount, an underwater volcano 500 km (310 mi) west of Gray's Harbor, Washington
- Cobb hotspot, a volcanic hotspot off the Oregon/Washington coast

== Buildings ==
- Cobb Building (Wagoner, Oklahoma), on the National Register of Historic Places in Oklahoma
- Cobb Building (Seattle, Washington), on the National Register of Historic Places listings in Washington state
- Cobb House (disambiguation), various houses on the National Register of Historic Places
- Cobb Stadium, a multi-purpose stadium on the University of Miami campus in Coral Gables, Florida

== Roads ==
- Cobb Highway, New South Wales, Australia
- Cobb Parkway, Cobb County, Georgia

== Other uses ==
- Cob (material), or cobb, a building material for making walls using compacted clay, sand and straw
- Cobb (film), a 1994 film about Ty Cobb
  - Cobb (soundtrack)
- Cobb (play), a 1989 play about Ty Cobb
- Cobb, today Cobb-Vantress, a brand of commercial broiler chicken
- CobB, a bacterial protein
- Cobb & Co, the name of many Australian coaching businesses
- Cobb & Co. (New Zealand), a 19th-century operator of a fleet of stagecoaches
- Cobb baronets, an extinct title in the Baronetage of England
- Cobb Divinity School, a former graduate school
- Cobb Field, a baseball park in Billings, Montana
- Cobb salad, a chopped salad named for Robert Howard Cobb
- Cobb surgical elevator, an orthopedic surgical instrument used to scrape bone
- USCGC Cobb (WPG-181), a US Coast Guard cutter

== See also ==
- Cob (disambiguation)
- Cobb angle, a system of measuring spine deformities
- Cobbs, surname
- Cobbs Creek, Delaware County, Pennsylvania
- Cobb's Legion, a Confederate unit in the American Civil War
- 1st Kentucky Artillery, also known as Cobb's Battery, a Confederate unit
- Kob, an antelope
- Ty Cobb (disambiguation)
