= Thomas Cobb =

Thomas Cobb may refer to:

- Thomas R. Cobb (1828–1892), U.S. Representative from Indiana
- Thomas Reade Rootes Cobb (1823–1862), American lawyer, author, politician, and Confederate general
- Thomas W. Cobb (1784–1830), United States Representative and Senator from Georgia
- Thomas Cobb (1854–1932), British crime writer
- Thomas Cobb (author), American novelist and author of Crazy Heart
- Tom Cobb, three-act farce by W. S. Gilbert
- Sir Thomas Cobb, 1st Baronet of the Cobb baronets
- Thomas Cobb (director), American director, editor, compositor, and cinematographer
- Thomas Tracy Cobb (1916–2004), American politician

== See also ==
- Cobb (surname)
