= Ty (given name) =

The personal name Ty, which is often short for Tyler, Tyrone, etc., may refer to:

== In arts and entertainment ==
=== Film and television ===
- Ty Barnett (born 1975), American actor
- Ty Burrell (born 1967), American actor
- Ty Glaser (born 1982), English actress
- Ty Hardin (1930–2017), American actor
- Ty Hodges (born 1981), American television actor
- Ty Granderson Jones (born 1964), American actor
- Ty Miller (born 1964), American actor
- Ty Mitchell (born 1993), American actor
- Ty Olsson (born 1974), Canadian actor
- Ty O'Neal (born 1978), American actor
- Ty Pennington (born 1964), American television host
- Ty Simpkins (born 2001), American actor
- Ty Tennant (born 2002), English actor
- Ty Treadway (born 1967), American television host
- Ty Williams (actor) (born 1966), American film actor
- Ty Wood (born 1995), Canadian actor

=== Music ===
- TY Bello (born 1978), Nigerian singer-songwriter
- Ty Burhoe (born 1964), American player
- Ty Dennis (born 1971), American drummer
- Ty England (born 1963), American singer
- Ty Fyffe, American musical artist
- Ty Herndon (born 1962), American country music singer
- Ty Jeffries, British composer
- Ty Longley (1971–2003), American rock guitarist
- Ty Tabor (born 1961), American rock musician and singer
- Ty Taylor (born 1969), American musician
- Ty Segall (born 1987), American rock musician
- Ty Smith (drummer) (born 1977), American drummer
- Ty Dolla Sign (born 1982), American singer

=== Other arts and entertainment ===
- Ty Burr (born 1957), American film critic
- Ty Defoe, Ojibwe and Oneida performance artist
- Ty Templeton (born 1962), Canadian comic book artist
- Ty Tyson (1888–1968), American sportscaster

== In sport ==
=== Football ===
- Ty Allert (born 1963), American football player
- Ty Benefield (born 2005), American football player
- Ty Bryant (born 2004), American football player
- Ty Chandler (American football), American football player
- Ty Clarke (born 1953), American football coach
- Ty Darlington (born 1994), American football player
- Ty Detmer (born 1967), American football player
- Ty Dieffenbach (born 2005), American football player
- Ty Disney (1908–1962), American football player
- Ty Esler (born 1971), Australian rules football player
- Ty Fryfogle (born 1999), American football player
- Ty Gooden (born 1972), English footballer
- Ty Hallock (born 1971), American football player
- Ty Hamilton (born 2002), American football player
- Ty Haywood (born 2006), American football player
- T. Y. Hilton (born 1989), American football player
- Ty Howard (born 1973), American football player
- Ty Isaac (born 1994), American football player
- Ty Johnson (American football) (born 1997), American football player
- Ty Jordan (2001–2020), American football player
- Ty Knott (born 1967), American football coach
- Ty Krentler (1895–1971), American football player
- Ty Law (born 1974), American football player
- Ty Long (born 1993), American football punter
- Ty Montgomery (born 1993), American football player
- Ty Nsekhe (born 1985), American football player
- Ty Okada (born 1999), American football player
- Ty Parten (born 1969), American football player
- Ty Powell (born 1988), American football player
- Ty Rauber (1905–1949), American football player
- Ty Robinson (born 2001), American football player
- Ty Sambrailo (born 1992), American football player
- Ty Scott (born 1999), American football player
- Ty Shipalane (born 1985), South African footballer
- Ty Simpson (born 2002), American football player
- Ty Summers (born 1996), American football player
- Ty Vickery (born 1990), Australian rules footballer
- Ty Warren (born 1981), American football player
- Ty Williams (born 1980), Australian professional rugby league footballer
- Ty Zantuck (born 1982), Australian rules footballer
- Ty Zentner (born 1998), American football player

=== Baseball ===
- Ty Blach (born 1990), American baseball player
- Ty Van Burkleo (born 1963), American baseball coach
- Ty Buttrey (born 1993), American baseball pitcher
- Ty Cobb (1886–1961), American baseball player
- Ty Cline (born 1939), American baseball player
- Ty Eriksen (born 1984), American professional baseball player
- Ty Floyd (born 2001), American baseball player
- Ty France (born 1994), American baseball third baseman
- Ty Gainey (born 1960), American baseball player
- Ty Griffin (born 1967), American baseball player
- Ty Harrington (born 1951), American baseball player
- Ty Helfrich (1890–1955), American baseball player
- Ty Hensley (born 1993), American professional baseball player
- Ty Kelly (born 1988), American-Israeli baseball player
- Ty LaForest (1917–1947), Canadian professional baseball player
- Ty Neal, American baseball player
- Ty Pickup (1897–1974), American professional baseball player
- Ty Taubenheim (born 1982), American baseball player
- Ty Tyson (baseball) (1892–1953), American baseball player
- Ty Wigginton (born 1977), American baseball player

=== Basketball ===
- Ty Abbott (born 1988), American basketball player
- Ty Jerome (born 1997), American basketball player
- Ty Greene (born 1992), American basketball player
- Ty Harrelson (born 1980), American basketball player
- Ty Harris (born 1991), American basketball player
- Ty Lawson (born 1987), American basketball player
- Ty Leaf (born 1997), Israeli-American basketball player
- Ty Margenthaler (born 1971), American basketball coach
- Ty Nurse (born 1990), Canadian basketball player
- TY Tang (born 1984), Filipino basketball player
- Ty Toney (born 1994), American basketball player
- Ty Walker (basketball) (born 1989), American basketball player

=== Hockey ===
- Ty Arbour (1896–1979), Canadian ice hockey player
- Ty Conklin (born 1976), American ice hockey player
- Ty Dellandrea (born 2000), Canadian ice hockey centre
- Ty Eigner (born 1968), American ice hockey head coach
- Ty Gallagher (born 2003), American ice hockey player
- Ty Jones (born 1978), American ice hockey player
- Ty Rattie (born 1993), Canadian ice hockey player
- Ty Rimmer (born 1992), Canadian ice hockey goaltender
- Ty Smith (ice hockey) (born 2000), Canadian ice hockey defenceman
- Ty Wishart (born 1988), Canadian ice hockey defenceman

=== Other sports ===
- Ty Capps (born 1983), American professional golfer
- Ty Danco (born 1955), American luger
- Ty Dillon (born 1992), American race car driver
- Ty Gibbs (born 2002), American professional stock car racing driver
- Ty Harden (born 1984), American soccer player
- Ty Keough (born 1956), American soccer player
- Ty Alexander Lindeman (born 1997), Canadian badminton player
- Ty Loomis (born 1979), American beach volleyball player
- Ty Majeski (born 1994), American racing driver
- Ty Maurin (born 1982), American soccer player
- Ty Murray (born 1969), nine-time world champion rodeo cowboy
- Ty Page (born 1958), American skateboarder
- Ty Proctor (born 1987), Australian speedway rider
- Ty Tryon (born 1984), American professional golfer
- Ty Walker (born 1997), American snowboarder

== In other fields ==
- Ty Carter (born 1980), American soldier
- Ty Cobb (attorney) (born 1950), American lawyer
- Ty Conn (1967–1999), Canadian bank robber
- Ty Cullen, American politician
- Ty Gurfein (born 1989), American dancer
- Ty Harrell (born 1970), American politician
- Ty King-Wall, New Zealand ballet dancer
- Tyrone Ty Lund (born 1938), Canadian politician
- Ty McCormick, American correspondent
- Ty Masterson (born 1969), American politician
- Ty Norris (born 1965), American developer
- Ty Tashiro, American author
- Ty Votaw (born 1962), American lawyer
- Ty Warner (born 1944), American toy manufacturer

== See also ==
- Ty (disambiguation)
- Ty (surname)
- Tó, nicknames
