= Antony Powys-Lybbe =

British amateur racing driver (1909–2004)

- Born: Antony Powys-Lybbe; 4 June 1909 Streatley, Berkshire, England
- Died: 10 May 2004 (aged 94) Amersham, Buckinghamshire, England

Antony Powys-Lybbe (4 June 1909 – 10 May 2004) was a British amateur racing driver, who took part in the Donington Grand Prix before the Second World War.

== Career ==
Powys-Lybbe started racing in the late 1920s in a Swift Ten, while stationed with the British Army at Catterick, North Yorkshire, and won an award in his first event, at Richmond. In 1931 he bought an Alvis 12/60 , which he considerably modified for Brooklands racing, and also used it in the first-ever meeting at the Donington Park circuit. Having inherited a large sum of money in 1930 on the death of his father, he resigned his Army commission in 1932, in order to go motor racing. He also bought a 1903 Fiat 16-20 HP with which he took part in the London to Brighton Veteran Car Run until the 1950s.

Powys-Lybbe focussed on racing in Ireland, as the prize and sponsorship money meant that he could break even on his racing, and acquired an Alvis Silver Eagle for sports and touring car events.

In 1935, Powys-Lybbe decided to put a toe in the water with more prestigious categories, and bought an Alfa Romeo Monza. His biggest races were the 1936 Donington Grand Prix in the Monza, in which he was flagged off with 2 laps remaining (being classified in 7th), and the 1937 International 500km Race at Brooklands, finishing 4th in John Cobb's 4-litre Sunbeam, shared with Charles Brackenbury. His name was put down for the 1937 Donington Grand Prix but this may have been a mistake by the British Racing Drivers Club, as, with the Monza likely to be outclassed by the Silver Arrows, he never intended to enter. In 1937 he bought a 1.5 litre Talbot-Darracq to undertake a season of voiturette racing, but soon sold it, finding it unfit for purpose.

In 1948 Powys-Lybbe bought an Alfa Romeo Tipo B from French racer "Raph", and he used it in low-key races over the next few years, as well as undertaking his habitual trips to Ireland. His biggest successes were winning the Wakefield Trophy at The Curragh in the Alfa in 1949 and 1953, and the Leinster Trophy and Ulster Trophy in 1950. He planned to upgrade to a Jaguar D-type in 1953 but cancelled the deal when the price was raised by £1,000, and retired in 1954 after witnessing Joe Quinn's accident in the 1954 Wakefield Trophy, in which Quinn and two spectators were killed.

== Personal life ==
In 1938, in anticipation of the Second World War, Powys-Lybbe signed up for the Royal Corps of Signals, with which he had trained as an officer; he served in North Africa and Italy.

A keen musician, in 1957 he became an Associate of the Royal College of Music. In 1968, as a sideline to managing the family estate, he became a freelance piano tuner. He married Rosemary Ferrand in Woolhampton in 1937 and the couple had five children.

In 2017, the revived Alvis car company planned to make a set of continuation classic cars, one of which was to be named in honour of Powys-Lybbe.

== Results ==
- Single-seaters
- Sportscars
