= Ty =

TY or Ty may refer to:

== People ==
- Ty (given name), includes a list of people with the given name or nickname
- Ty (surname), a list of people
- Zheng (surname), spelled Ty in the Philippines
- Ty (rapper) (1972–2020), Nigerian-British hip-hop artist
- Ty Dolla Sign, stage name of American rapper Tyrone Griffin, Jr (born 1982)

== Fictional characters ==
- Tiberius "Ty" Blackthorn, from the media franchise The Shadowhunter Chronicles
- Ty Harper, in the Australian soap opera Neighbours
- Ty Lee, a recurring character in the television series Avatar: The Last Airbender
- Ty Turner, in from the American television series The Fairly OddParents: Fairly Odder
- Ty Rux, a T-Trux in the TV series Dinotrux
- Ty Webb, in the film Caddyshack
- The main character in the video game Ty the Tasmanian Tiger
- Ty, a character in the arcade game Pit Fighter

== Other uses ==
- Thank you, Internet chat abbreviation
- T.Y., the common abbreviated name for the town of Teyateyaneng, Lesotho
- Ty (digraph)
- Týr or Ty, a god in Norse mythology
- Ty (company), an American multinational corporation which owns the Beanie Babies franchise
- Tahitian language (ISO 639-1 code ty)
- Transition Year, an academic year in secondary education in Ireland
- Tokyu's Toyoko Line (railway line prefix TY)

== See also ==
- Ty Formation, a geologic formation in Wales
- Ty Ty, Georgia, an American city
- Ty Cobb (disambiguation)
