= Ty Cobb (disambiguation) =

Ty Cobb (1886–1961) was an American baseball player. Other uses of the name include:

- Ty Cobb (attorney) (born 1950), American lawyer and former Assistant US Attorney
- Ty Cobb (politician) (born 1975), American politician and former member of the Nevada Assembly
- "Ty Cobb" (song), 1997 single by Soundgarden
- Ty Cobb Healthcare System, nonprofit health care organization in Georgia, US

== See also ==
- Ty (disambiguation)
- Cobb (disambiguation)
