= Randy Kirner =

American politician

Member of the Nevada Assembly from the 26th district
- In office February 7, 2011 – November 9, 2016
- Preceded by: Ty Cobb
- Succeeded by: Lisa Krasner

Personal details
- Born: 1946 (age 79–80) Los Angeles, California, U.S.
- Party: Republican
- Education: North Georgia College & State University; Georgia State University; West Coast University; University of La Verne
- Website: randykirner.org

Randy Kirner (born 1946) is an American politician and a former Republican member of the Nevada Assembly since February 7, 2011 representing District 26.

== Education ==
Kirner earned his BS in business administration from North Georgia College & State University (now University of North Georgia), his MBA from Georgia State University, his MS from West Coast University, and his EdD from the University of La Verne.

== Elections ==
- 2012 Kirner was unopposed for the June 12, 2012 Republican Primary and won the November 6, 2012 General election with 19,926 votes (60.75%) against Democratic nominee Rodney Petzak, who had previously run in 2004.
- 2010 When Republican Assemblyman Ty Cobb ran for Nevada Senate and left the District 26 seat open, Kirner won the four-way June 8, 2010 Republican Primary with 3,395 votes (37.30%), and won the three-way November 2, 2010 General election with 16,264 votes (55.66%) against Democratic nominee Angie Taylor and Independent American candidate Gregory Miller (who had previous run for the seat in 2002 and 2004).
