= Prince Hoare =

Prince Hoare is the name of two English artists, both closely related to William Hoare.

- Prince Hoare (elder) (1711–1769), sculptor, brother of William Hoare
- Prince Hoare (younger) (1755–1834), painter and playwright, son of William Hoare
