= Edward Cobb =

Edward Cobb may refer to:

- Edward Cobb (politician) (1891–1957), English politician
- Sir Edward Cobb, 2nd Baronet, of the Cobb baronets
- Ned Cobb (1885–1973), American farmer
- Ed Cobb (1938–1999), American musician

== See also ==
- Cobb (surname)
