= Queen of Clean =

Queen of Clean is a nickname that may refer to:

- Linda Cobb (born c. 1950), an American writer and columnist who focuses on cleaning solutions
- Kim Woodburn (1942–2025), an English media personality who co-presented How Clean Is Your House?
