= George Cobb =

George Cobb may refer to:

- George T. Cobb (1813–1870), U.S. Representative from New Jersey
- George H. Cobb (1864–1943), acting Lieutenant Governor of New York in 1910
- George L. Cobb (1886–1942), ragtime composer
- George Cobb (lighthouse keeper), American lighthouse keeper
- USCGC George Cobb, coastal buoy tender
- George Cobb (baseball) (1865–1926), American Major League Baseball player
- George Cobb (golf) (1914–1986), American golf course designer
- George Cobb (coach) (1885–1957), head coach of the Rhode Island Rams football team, 1909–1911, and 1913–1914
- Sir George Cobb, 3rd Baronet, of the Cobb baronets

== See also ==
- Cobb (surname)
