= Cobbe =

Cobbe is an Irish surname, and may refer to:

- Cobbe family, a prominent Irish family
- Alec Cobbe (1945-2026), Irish artist and decorator
- Alexander Cobbe, Irish General and holder of VC
- Frances Power Cobbe, Irish writer and animal rights activist
- Charles Cobbe, Archbishop of Dublin
- Clement Cobbe (after 1527-?1574), English politician
- John Cobbe, New Zealand politician
- Cobbe portrait, believed to be the only existing painting of William Shakespeare, in possession of the Cobbe family at the Newbridge Estate

== See also ==
- Cobb (surname)
- Cobbs, surname
