= Eileen Ellison =

British Grand Prix racer

Eileen Ellison (12 December 1910 – 29 July 1967) was a British Grand Prix racer. Born in Great Shelford, Cambridgeshire, she was a daughter of Sidney and Theresa Ellison (formerly Vinter). She had a sister, Diana, and a brother, Tony.

== Background ==
Due to her brother's interest in motorsport, Ellison became interested in racing in the late 1920s. She befriended a racing driver of the day, Thomas Pitt Cholmondeley-Tapper, and soon began racing herself. She was frequently noted as the entrant when Cholmondeley-Tapper raced, chiefly because it was her car used; Tony Ellison invariably being the mechanic.

Her main racing achievement came in 1932 when she won the Duchess of York's race for women drivers at Brooklands. The competitors included Elsie Wisdom (Invicta), Fay Taylour (Talbot 105) and Kay Petre (Daytona Wolseley Hornet Special). Eileen Ellison won from Kay Petre.

With her brother and Cholmondeley Tapper, Ellison travelled throughout Europe to racing venues. Cholmondeley-Tapper wrote a book entitled Amateur Racing Driver about his exploits but Ellison is only briefly mentioned.

World War II drew a halt to motorsport in Europe but by this time, Eileen Ellison had stopped racing after marrying Squadron Leader Brian Lane in 1940. Lane was killed in action in 1942.

After a period of mourning, Ellison moved to South Africa c.1953 with wealthy landowner, Owen Fargus who lived in the same apartment complex as Eileen. He owned property in the United Kingdom, in South Africa and Jersey and the couple led a jet-setting lifestyle. She remained with Fargus until her death in Jersey in 1967. Owen Fargus also later died in Jersey in 1990.
