= Henry Cobb =

Henry Cobb may refer to:

- Henry Peyton Cobb (1835–1910), English banker, solicitor and Liberal politician
- Henry Ives Cobb (1859–1931), American architect
- Henry Ives Cobb Jr. (1883–1974), American artist and architect, son of Henry Ives Cobb
- Henry H. Cobb (1920–2013), U.S. Army major general
- Henry N. Cobb (1926–2020), American architect
