= General Cobb =

General Cobb may refer to:

- Amasa Cobb (1823–1905), Union Army brevet brigadier general of volunteers
- David Cobb (Massachusetts politician) (1748–1830), U.S. Army major general
- Henry H. Cobb (1920–2013), U.S. Army major general
- Howell Cobb (1815–1868), Confederate States Army major general
- Patrick Cobb (fl. 1990s–2020s), U.S. Air Force major general
- Thomas Reade Rootes Cobb (1823–1862), Confederate States Army brigadier general

== See also ==
- Alexander Cobbe (1870–1931), British Indian Army general
