= Prince Hoare (elder) =

English sculptor

Prince Hoare (c. 1711 – 5 November 1769) was an English sculptor. "Prince" in this instance was a given name, not a royal title.

== Life ==
Possibly born near Eye, Suffolk, brother of William Hoare RA, he trained under Peter Scheemakers in London. He subsequently settled in Bath with his brother but spent much of the 1740s in Italy. He returned to Bath in 1749 and remained active as a sculptor. On 26 May 1751 he married Mary Coulthurst (1716–1751) daughter of the clothier Henry Coulthurst of Melksham with a dowry of £6,000. Despite his new found wealth he continued as a sculptor.

He died in Bath on 8 November 1769.

== Family ==
In May 1751 he married Miss Mary Colthurst of the Colthurst baronets of Melksham and received a dowry of £6000 (the equivalent of £1 million in 2020).

== Works ==
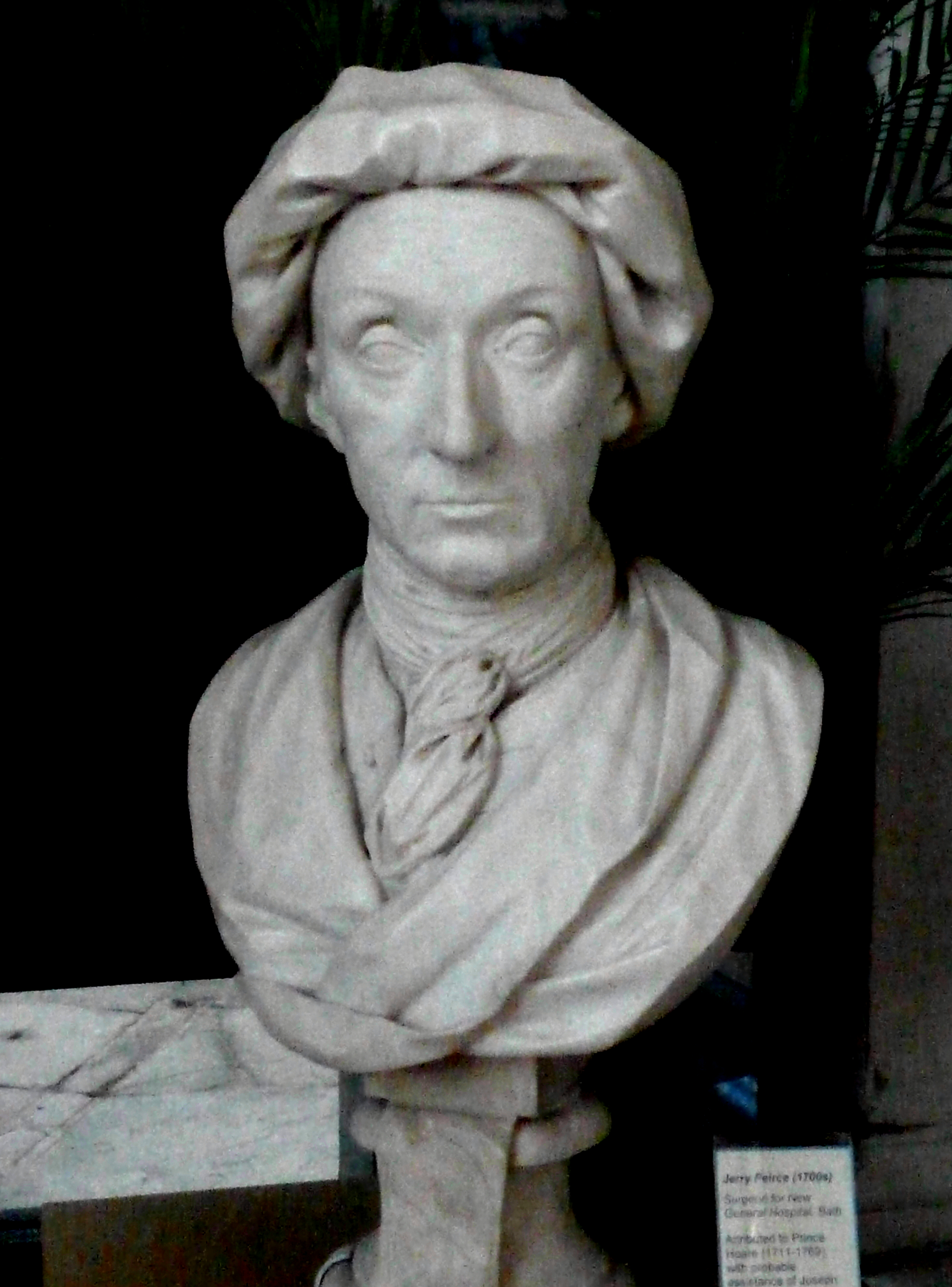
Bust of Jeremiah Peirce, attributed to Prince Hoare the elder

- Monument to Jacob Selfe at Melksham (1730)
- Memorial to Bishop Isaac Maddox in Worcester Cathedral (1743)
- Monument to Mary Hilliard at Kilmersdon (1745)
- Monument to John Long at Heddington (1746)
- Memorial to Lady Cobb at Newton St. Loe (1749)
- Monument to Jacob Barclay at Weston, Somerset (1750)
- Statue of Richard Nash at the Pump Room, Bath (1752)
- Marble bust of Philip Stanhope, 4th Earl of Chesterfield (1740)
- Various statuary groups for Sir Robert Throckmorton for his houses at Buckland and Coughton (1754)
- Bust of Ralph Allen in Bath Hospital (1757)
- Monument to the Eyles family in Devizes Parish Church (1757)
- Monument to Thomas Dawtrey at Petworth (1758)
- Four goddess statues at Stourhead commissioned by Henry Hoare (1759)
- Various chimey-pieces for Corsham Court (1760-1765)
- Monument to Thomas Collins at St Leonard's Church in Exeter (1761)
- Bust of Richard Nash at the Guildhall, Bath (1761)
- Monument to Alexander Pope in St Mary's Church, Twickenham (1761)
- Monument to Anne Carey at Steeple Aston (1762)
- Monument to Lord John Trevor at Bromham, Bedfordshire (1764)
- Bust of Alexander Pope in Bath Art Gallery (dnk)
- Bust of Jeremiah "Jerry" Peirce, surgeon, in Harrogate, North Yorkshire (before 1765)

== Bibliography ==
- Newby, Evelyn (1986). "The Hoares of Bath". Bath History. 1: 90–127. ISBN 0-86299-294-X
- Newby, E. (2006) "Prince Hoare I", Grove Art Online, Oxford University Press, retrieved 15 August 2007 (subscription required)
- Whinney, M. (1988). Physick, J. (ed.). Sculpture in Britain, 1530–1830 (Pelican History of Art, rev. ed.). London: Penguin. pp. 457, n.20. ISBN 0140561234.
