= COBS =

COBS may refer to:

- Consistent Overhead Byte Stuffing
- Adenosylcobinamide-GDP ribazoletransferase (CobS), an enzyme
- Comet Observation Database

== See also ==
- Cob (disambiguation)
