= Cobby =

Cobby is a Danish surname that commemorates the Bishop of Viborg, Canute Mikkelsen.

Notable people with the surname include:

- Ali Cobby Eckermann (born 1963), Australian poet of Aboriginal Australian ancestry
- Anita Cobby (1959–1986), Australian murder victim
- Brian Cobby (1929–2012), British actor
- Harry Cobby (1894–1955), Australian air commodore and First World War flying ace
- Steve Cobby, UK musician, composer, DJ and producer
- William Cobby (1877–1957), English rugby player

== See also ==
- Cobi (disambiguation)
- Cobbe
- Cobby dog
