= Joe Cobb =

Joseph or Joe Cobb may refer to:

- Joseph B. Cobb (1819–1858), American writer and politician from Georgia
- Joe Cobb (baseball) (1895–1947), American catcher for Detroit Tigers
- Joe Cobb (actor) (1916–2002), American child member of Our Gang
- Joe Cobb (mayor) (born 1961/2), American politician
- Joe Cobb (footballer) (born 1990), English defender for Shepshed Dynamo
- Joe Cobb, candidate in the 2008 United States House of Representatives elections in Arizona
