= Senator Cobb =

Senator Cobb may refer to:

== Members of the United States Senate ==
- Thomas W. Cobb (1784–1830), U.S. Senator from Georgia

== United States state senate members ==
- Amasa Cobb (1823–1905), Wisconsin State Senate
- David Cobb (Massachusetts politician) (1748–1830), Massachusetts State Senate
- George H. Cobb (1864–1943), New York State Senate
- George T. Cobb (1813–1870), New Jersey State Senate
- Rufus W. Cobb (1829–1913), Alabama State Senate
- Spencer Cobb (1916–1962), Kentucky State Senate
- Stephen A. Cobb (1833–1878), Kansas State Senate
