= Brian Lane (RAF officer) =

British flying ace and author

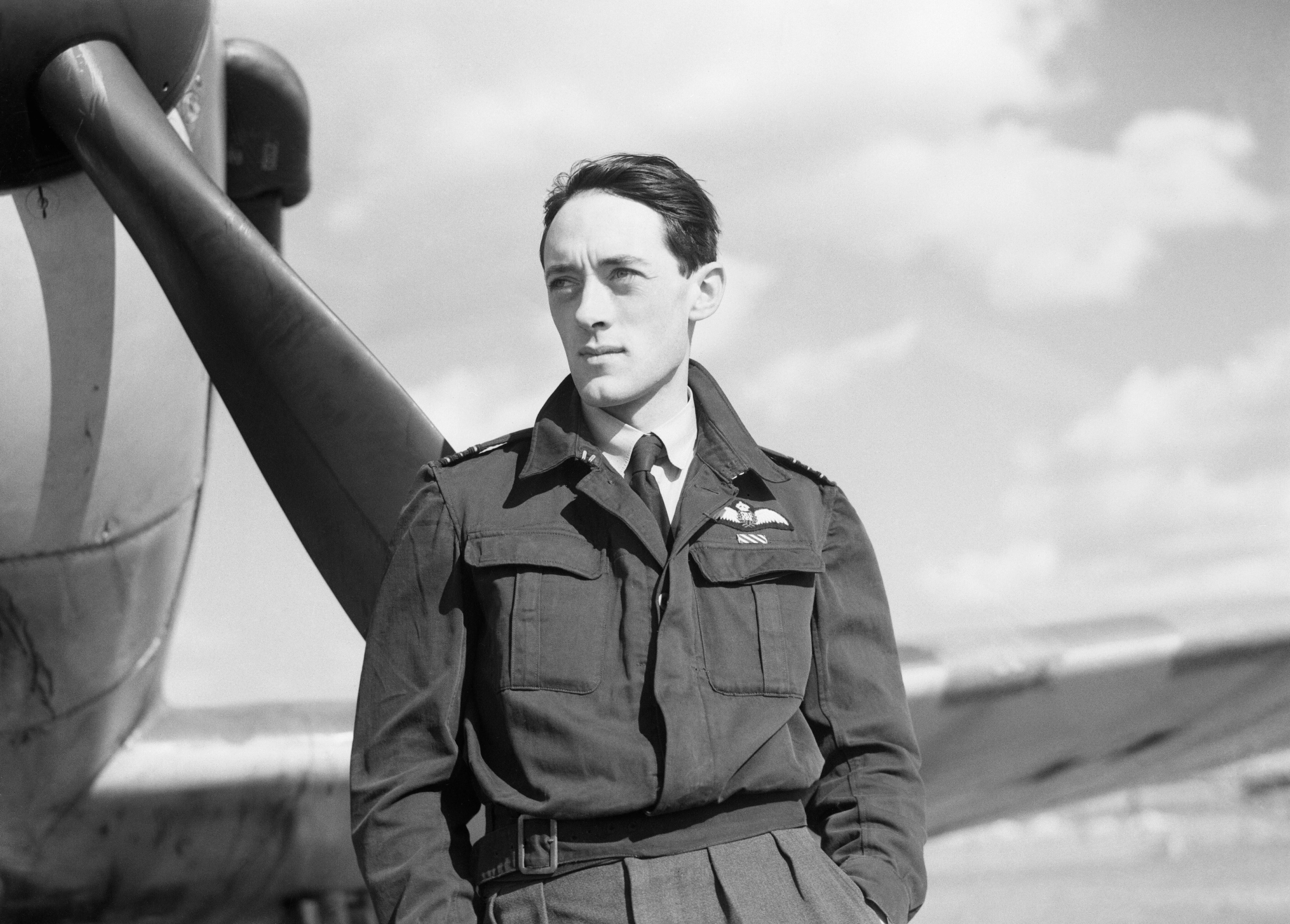
- Lane, 1940
- Born: 18 June 1917; Harrogate, England
- Died: 13 December 1942 (aged 25); North Sea
- Military career
- Allegiance: United Kingdom
- Branch: Royal Air Force
- Service years: 1936–1942
- Rank: Squadron Leader
- Nickname: Sandy
- Commands: No. 19 Squadron; No. 167 Squadron
- Conflicts: Second World War: Battle of France; Battle of Britain; Circus offensive
- Awards: Distinguished Flying Cross; Mention in despatches

Brian John Edward "Sandy" Lane DFC (18 June 1917 – 13 December 1942) was a fighter pilot and flying ace of the Royal Air Force (RAF) during the Second World War. He also wrote the book Spitfire!, an account of his experiences as a fighter pilot during the Battle of Britain.

Born in Harrogate, Lane joined the RAF in 1936 and was posted to No. 66 Squadron when his training was completed. Days after the Second World War broke out, he was transferred to No. 19 Squadron as a flight commander. Flying the Supermarine Spitfire fighter, he shot down a number of German aircraft during sorties to support the evacuation of the British Expeditionary Force from Dunkirk during the period late May to early June 1940. He also briefly commanded the squadron during this time. Awarded the Distinguished Flying Cross in July, he became the squadron's permanent commander two months later, by which time it was engaged in the Battle of Britain. He claimed further aerial victories during the aerial campaign over England. He was on staff duties for a year from mid-1941 during which time he wrote Spitfire!, published under a pseudonym in 1942. He returned to operations with command of No. 167 Squadron in late 1942. He went missing on a sortie to Holland on 13 December.

== Early life ==
Born in Harrogate, England, on 18 June 1917, Brian John Edward Lane was the son of Henry Fitzgerald William Lane and Bessie Elinor (nee Hall). He grew up in the London suburb of Pinner and attended St Paul's School in Hammersmith. After leaving school, Lane worked as a factory supervisor before applying for a short service commission in the Royal Air Force (RAF) after losing his job in 1935. His initial training commenced in March 1936 at No. 3 Elementary and Reserve Flying Training at Hamble and two months later he was provisionally accepted into the RAF as an acting pilot officer.

Lane, who was nicknamed 'Sandy', proceeded to No. 11 Flying Training School at Wittering in June. Upon completion of his training in January 1937, he was posted to No. 66 Squadron. This unit was based at Duxford and equipped with the Gloster Gauntlet fighter. Some months later, Lane moved to No. 213 Squadron. Like his former unit, this operated the Gauntlet but was based at Northolt. In early 1939 it started converting to the Hawker Hurricane fighter by which time Lane was a flying officer, having been promoted to this rank the previous December.

== Second World War ==
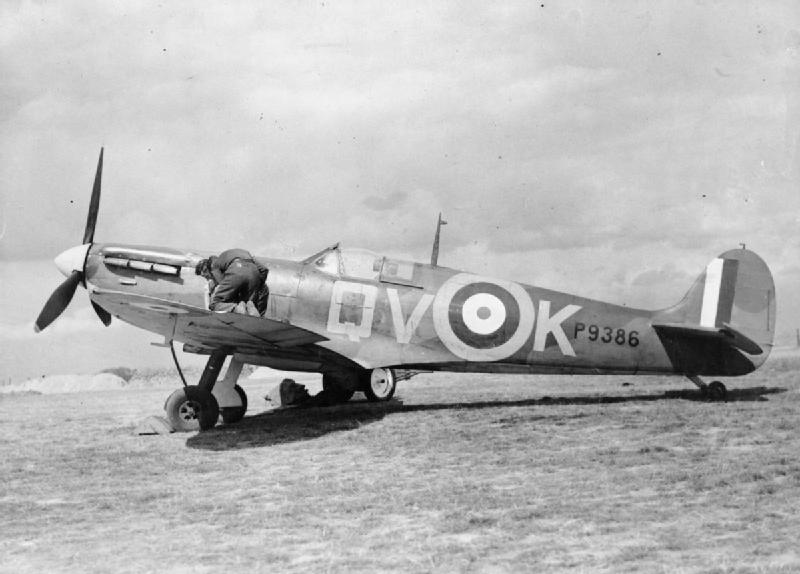
Lane occasionally flew this Supermarine Spitfire fighter during the period he commanded No. 19 Squadron

Shortly after the outbreak of war, Lane was posted to No. 19 Squadron. This was based at Duxford and operated Supermarine Spitfire fighters, having been the first unit in the RAF to receive the type two years previously. Lane became leader of one of its flights and for a time Douglas Bader, then a flying officer, was under his command. For the next several months the squadron mostly carried out protective patrols over shipping convoys plying the east coast but in late May 1940 it moved to Hornchurch from where it was involved in providing aerial cover over the beaches at Dunkirk during Operation Dynamo, the evacuation of the British Expeditionary Force from France. On one sortie, carried out on 25 May, the squadron's commander was killed. Lane was appointed the temporary commanding officer of the unit. The next day, he shot down two Messerschmitt Bf 109 fighters and a Junkers Ju 87 dive bomber in the area around Dunkirk although only one of these, a Bf 109, could be confirmed. He shot down a Messerschmitt Bf 110 heavy fighter in the same vicinity on 1 June.

=== Battle of Britain ===
After the Dunkirk evacuation was completed in early June, No. 19 Squadron returned to Duxford. Squadron Leader Philip Pinkham took command of the unit and later that month it commenced trials with cannon-equipped Spitfires. During this time, Lane married Eileen Ellison in Cambridge; his wife was a well known racing car driver who had won motor racing events at Brooklands in the 1930s. In July the squadron resumed operational duties, again carrying out convoy patrols, but it soon became drawn into defending the Luftwaffe's campaign against the southeast of England. At the end of the month, Lane, an acting flight lieutenant, was awarded the Distinguished Flying Cross (DFC).

The cannons that equipped the Spitfires of No. 19 Squadron proved to be unreliable, and this affected its operations in the early stages of the Battle of Britain. Despite this, Lane shot down a Bf 110 over the Thames estuary on 24 August. By the start of September, the squadron had reverted to the standard machine-gun equipment and was regularly flying as part of No. 12 Group's Duxford Wing, which was led by the now Squadron Leader Bader. The Duxford Wing arose from an initiative of Bader's, calling for three squadrons to be scrambled at the same and in an coordinated group engage approaching Luftwaffe bomber formations. No. 19 Squadron's commander, Pinkham, was killed on 5 September; Lane, whose rank of flight lieutenant had just been made permanent, was immediately promoted to acting squadron leader and appointed as his replacement. Two days later he shot down a Bf 110 over North Weald. Flying an interception sortie on 11 September, he shot down a pair of Bf 110s and damaged a Heinkel He 111 medium bomber, all over Gravesend. On 15 September, now known as Battle of Britain Day, he probably destroyed a Bf 109 in the vicinity of London.

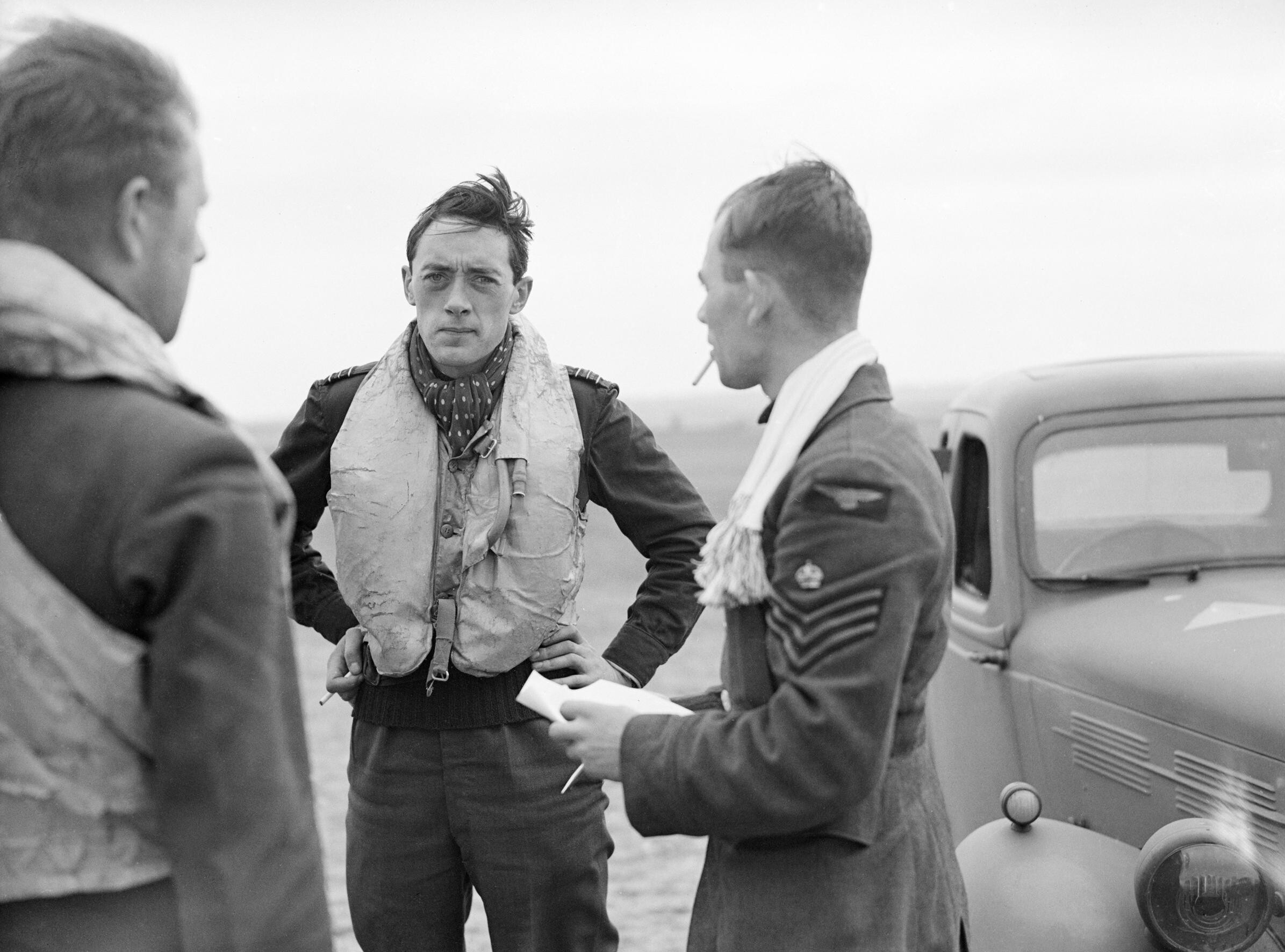
Brian Lane (centre) after a sortie during the Battle of Britain, 1940

The intensity of operations began to reduce from October, with increasingly fewer engagements with the Luftwaffe. On one such occasion, on 15 November, Lane shared in the destruction of a Bf 110 to the south of Southend. Operational tempo remained slow during the winter months.

=== Later war service ===
In early 1941, as the RAF switched away from defensive operations, No. 19 Squadron began flying to German-occupied France and the Low Countries on fighter sweeps and escorts to bombers as part of Fighter Command's Circus offensive. Mentioned in despatches on 17 March, Lane continued flying with No. 19 Squadron until June when he was posted to join the staff of the headquarters of No. 12 Group at Hucknall.

In November, Lane was posted on a staff appointment to the Middle East. He initially served at the Air Headquarters Western Desert but in February 1942 was moved to the RAF's Middle East Command. By this time, Lane's rank as squadron leader was permanent. He returned to England in June to take up command of No. 61 Operational Training Unit at Montford Bridge for several months. On 9 December, he returned to operational duties when he was posted to join No. 167 Squadron at Ludham as its commander.

No. 167 Squadron was equipped with the Spitfire Mk. Vc and tasked with carrying out patrols along the English coastline and offensive sorties, known as 'Rhubarbs', to German-occupied Europe. Lane made his first operational flight with the squadron on 13 December, leading three other Spitfires on a Rhubarb to the Dutch coast. His flight encountered a group of Focke-Wulf 190 fighters and Lane was last seen in pursuit of these. He is believed to have been shot down to the west of Schouwen Island and despite searches being mounted, his body was never recovered. He was survived by his wife Eileen Ellison, who died in 1967.

Having no known grave, Lane is commemorated on the Commonwealth War Graves Commission's Air Forces Memorial near Egham in Surrey, England. During Lane's operational career, he claimed six (and one shared) German aircraft shot down, two unconfirmed destroyed, one probably destroyed and one damaged.

== Legacy ==
Lane was the author of Spitfire!, written during his period of service as a staff officer at No. 12 Group and published in 1942 under the pseudonym B. J. Ellan. The book is a firsthand account of Lane's experiences as a front line Spitfire pilot with No. 19 Squadron during the Battle of Britain. When it was first published the identities of individuals in the book were suppressed. The military aviation historian Dilip Sarkar, who recognised Lane in one of the photographs in the book, conducted research on the original work to provide the correct names of people and places and the revised book was republished in 1990.

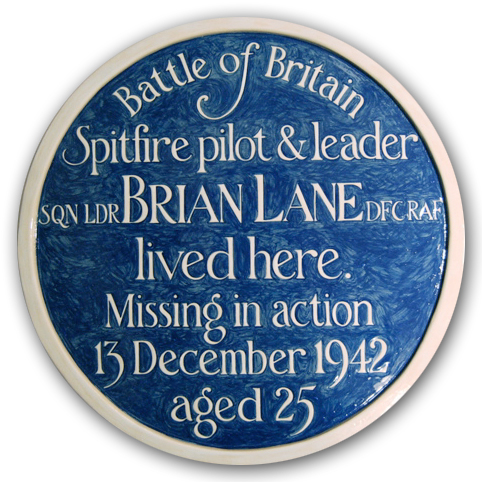
Memorial plaque to Lane in Pinner

A permanent memorial plaque, organised by local resident Paul Baderman, was unveiled on Lane's childhood home in Pinner on 25 September 2011, 69 years after his presumed death.
