= William Cobb =

William Cobb may refer to:

- Billy Cobb (born 1940), English former footballer active in the 1960s
- Will D. Cobb (1876–1930), American lyricist and composer
- William Cobb, a member of the Court of Owls.
- William Cobb (designer), designer and engineer of rollercoasters
- William Cobb (photographer), British photographer
- William Geikie-Cobb (1857–1941}, Anglican author and priest
- William H. Cobb, politician and father of baseball player Ty Cobb
- William J. Cobb, best known as Happy Humphrey, the heaviest professional wrestler of all time
- William Jelani Cobb (born 1969), American author and educator
- William Montague Cobb (1906–1990), physical anthropologist
- William Peyton Cobb (1880–1963), Secretary of State of Alabama
- William T. Cobb (1857–1937), Governor of Maine, 1905–1909
- Willie Cobb (fl. 1908–1909), American baseball player

== Fictional characters ==
- William Cobb (Eureka character), a character on the American science fiction drama Eureka

== See also ==
- Bill Cobbs (1934–2024), American character actor
