= Arthur Cobb =

English cricketer

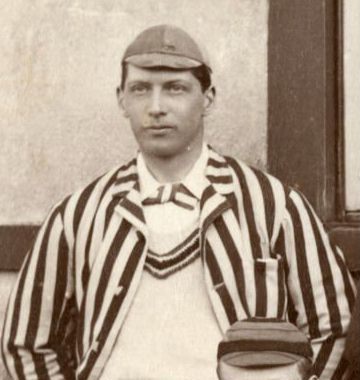
- Arthur Cobb, 1886

Personal information
- Full name: Arthur Rhodes Cobb
- Born: 12 March 1864; Bodicote, Oxfordshire, England
- Died: 6 November 1886 (aged 22); Bodicote, Oxfordshire, England
- Batting: Right-handed
- Role: Wicket-keeper
- Relatives: Charles Cobb (brother)

Domestic team information
- Years: Team
- 1884–1886: Oxford University

Career statistics
Competition	First-class
Matches	17
Runs scored	323
Batting average	11.53
100s/50s	0/2
Top score	51
Catches/stumpings	15/4
- Source: Cricinfo, 27 August 2019

Arthur Rhodes Cobb (12 March 1864 – 6 November 1886) was an English first-class cricketer.

The son of Timothy Cobb and his wife, Ellen Cobb (née Newbery), he was born at Cotefield House at Bodicote, Oxfordshire in March 1864. He was educated at Winchester College, before going up to New College, Oxford. While studying at Oxford, he made his debut in first-class cricket for Oxford University against the touring Australians at Oxford in 1884. He played first-class cricket for Oxford until 1886, making thirteen appearances. Playing as a wicket-keeper, he scored a total of 246 runs for Oxford at an average of 11.18 and a highest score of 50. Behind the stumps he took 12 catches and made 4 stumpings. While studying at Oxford, he went on two tours to North America in September 1885 and September–October 1886 with a team formed by the Devon amateur E. J. Sanders. He made four first-class appearances across the tours against the Philadelphian cricket team at Germantown. Across both tours, he scored a total of 77 runs in the tours first-class matches, with a high score of 51. He died from typhoid fever at Cotefield House in November 1886, aged 22. His brother, Charles, also played first-class cricket.
