= James Cobb =

James Cobb may refer to:

- James Cobb (librettist) (1756–1818), English librettist
- James E. Cobb (1835–1903), Alabama congressman in the U.S. House of Representatives
- James A. Cobb, African-American lawyer, judge, and civil rights activist
- Jimmy Cobb (1929–2020), American jazz musician
- J. R. Cobb (James Barney Cobb Jr., 1944–2019), American guitarist and songwriter
- Jim Cobb, American politician in the Tennessee House of Representatives
- James Cobb (Utah politician)
