= Cob =

Cob or COB may refer to:

== Animals ==
- Cob (horse), a small sturdy horse or large pony
- Cob, an adult male swan
- Cob, a gull or seabird of the genus Larus or of the family Laridae

== Parts of plants ==
- Corncob, the core or inner part of an ear of maize (corn) on which the kernels grow
- Cob or cob nut, another name for a hazelnut

== Materials and objects ==
- Cob (material), a building material for making walls using compacted clay, sand and straw
- Cob or cobbing board, a wooden instrument used for punishment: see Paddle (spanking)
- Cob, Spanish gold and silver coins that were irregularly shaped and crudely struck: see Spanish dollar
- Cob, a crusty bread roll shaped like a squashed ball, commonly used in the English Midlands: see List of bread rolls

== Geographical objects ==
- The Cob, a seawall in Porthmadog, Wales
- The Cob, a seawall in Malltraeth, Anglesey, Wales
- Kingsley Castle, also known as Castle Cob, a medieval motte in Kingsley, Cheshire, England

== People ==
- Cob Stenham (born 1932), English business executive

== Acronyms ==
- Bolivian Workers' Center, Central Obrera Boliviana in Spanish
- Brazilian Olympic Committee, Comitê Olímpico Brasileiro in Portuguese
- Brazilian Workers Confederation, Confederação Operária Brasileira in Portuguese
- Center of balance (disambiguation), multiple meanings
- Cercle Olympique de Bamako, a Malian football team
- Chairman of the board
- Chief of the boat, the most senior enlisted crewperson on United States Navy submarines
- Children of Bodom, a Finnish metal band
- Chip on board, a method of directly mounting semiconductors on printed circuit boards or substrates
- Church of the Brethren, an American religious denomination of German origin
- Church Office Building, headquarters of the Church of Jesus Christ of Latter-day Saints
- Clerk of the Board, of an organizational board or committee
- Clive's Original Band or C.O.B., an English folk band headed by Clive Palmer
- Close of Business, the formal end of the day in financial markets or offices
- Coburg railway station, Melbourne
- College of The Bahamas, the national public institution of higher education
- Company of Biologists, a UK charity that publishes scientific journals
- Continent-ocean boundary, the boundary between oceanic and continental crust on a passive margin
- Contingency Operating Base, a US military term, a forward operating base
- Continuity of Business, an acronym sometimes used in conjunction with Disaster Recovery
- Corn, Oats and Barley, a grain mix fed to horses and other livestock: see equine nutrition
- Creature Object, a simple programming language for the game Creatures (artificial life program)
- Crew overboard, in boating: see Man overboard

== Codes ==
- cob, the ISO 639-3 code for the Chicomuceltec language of Mexico and Guatemala
- COB, an obsolete country code for Republic of the Congo
- Cooden Beach railway station, a railway station in Sussex, England

== See also ==
- Cobb (disambiguation)
- Kob, an antelope
- COBS (disambiguation)
