= Fiona Cobb =

British engineer

Fiona Cobb is a British structural engineer and author of The Structural Engineer's Pocket Book. The pocket book was first published in 2003 and is in its 3rd Edition having sold nearly 40,000 copies and is part of the structural engineering exhibit in the mathematics gallery at London's Science Museum. Worldwide sales of the book exceed the 27,000 members of the Institution of Structural Engineers and the average 10,000 lifetime sales for non-fiction UK books.

Cobb was a STEM Ambassador early in her career, volunteering in schools and writing in the national press. She won the ACE's Young Consultant of the Year, 2007 for having published a core industry textbook before age 35 and being a notable woman in a male-dominated profession; the NCE/ACE judges citation said that "her belief in communicating the importance of the role of engineers in society is an example to all, as is the time she spends educating young people about why engineering is fun". Notable projects include The Weston Tower to the Queen's Diamond Jubilee Galleries at Westminster Abbey, the first structure to be added to the Abbey in 350 years. She has been a Conservation Accredited Engineer since 2009 and established Cobb & Company in 2019. In 2021, Cobb delivered the IStructE Sutherland History Lecture with Nina Baker on Forgotten Figures in Structural Engineering, presenting original research into the first two female members of the IStructE, Florence Mary Taylor (1926) and Mary Irvine (engineer) (1947).
