= Stephen Cobb =

Stephen Cobb may refer to:

- Stephen A. Cobb (1833–1878), U.S. Representative from Kansas
- Stephen T. Cobb (born 1952), expert on security, privacy, and related topics
- Sir Stephen Cobb (born 1962), British judge
