= Charles Cobb (cricketer) =

English cricketer

Personal information
- Full name: Charles Edward Cobb
- Born: 24 May 1863; Adderbury, Oxfordshire, England
- Died: 6 July 1922 (aged 59); Marylebone, London, England
- Batting: Right-handed
- Role: Wicket-keeper
- Relatives: Arthur Cobb (brother)

Domestic team information
- Years: Team
- 1900: AJ Webbe's XI
- 1895–1903: Buckinghamshire

Career statistics
Competition	First-class
Matches	1
Runs scored	36
Batting average	18.00
100s/50s	0/0
Top score	19
Catches/stumpings	1/0
- Source: Cricinfo, 25 May 2011

Charles Edward Cobb (24 May 1863 – 6 July 1922) was an English cricketer. Cobb was a right-handed batsman who fielded as a wicket-keeper. He was born in Adderbury, Oxfordshire. He was educated at Rugby School, where he represented the school cricket team.

Cobb made his debut for Buckinghamshire in the 1895 Minor Counties Championship against Oxfordshire, in what was Buckinghamshire's first Minor Counties Championship match. Cobb played Minor counties cricket for Buckinghamshire from 1895 to 1903, which included 44 Minor Counties Championship matches. On occasion he captained Buckinghamshire.

Cobb played his only first-class match for AJ Webbe's XI in 1900 against Oxford University. In this match, he scored 17 runs in the team's first innings, before being dismissed by Francis Humphrys. In their second-innings, he scored 19 runs before being dismissed by Frank Knox.

He spent part of his life in Egypt, playing for Alexandria Cricket Club against I Zingari in 1914. Cobb died in Marylebone, London on 6 July 1922. He survived his brother, Arthur, by 36 years. Arthur had played first-class cricket for Oxford University.
