= Alvis 12/60 =

Passenger car

The Alvis 12/60 was a passenger car produced by Alvis from 1931 to 1932 as a sports version of the 12/50 model.

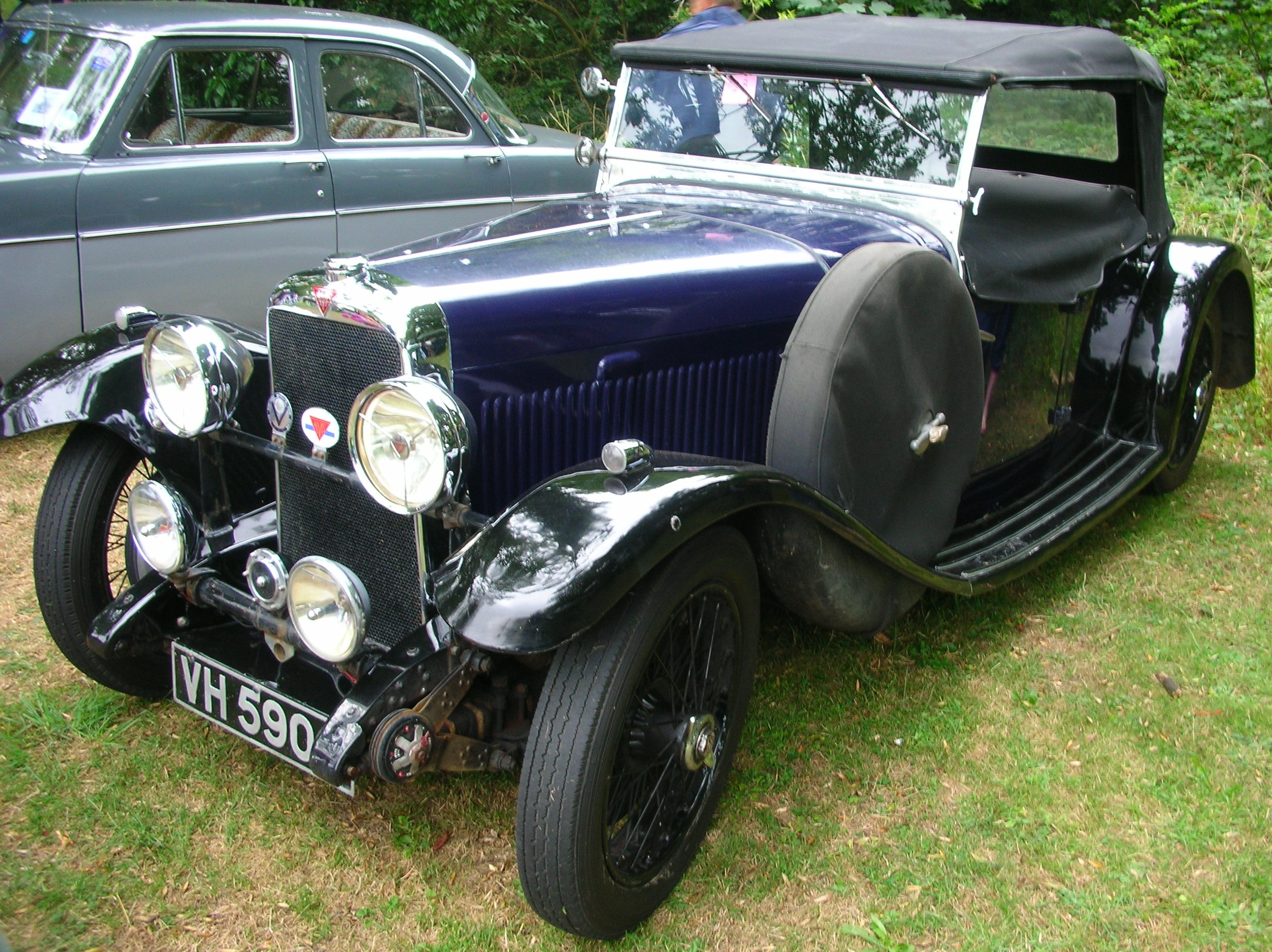
Alvis 12/60 Sports Tourer (1932)

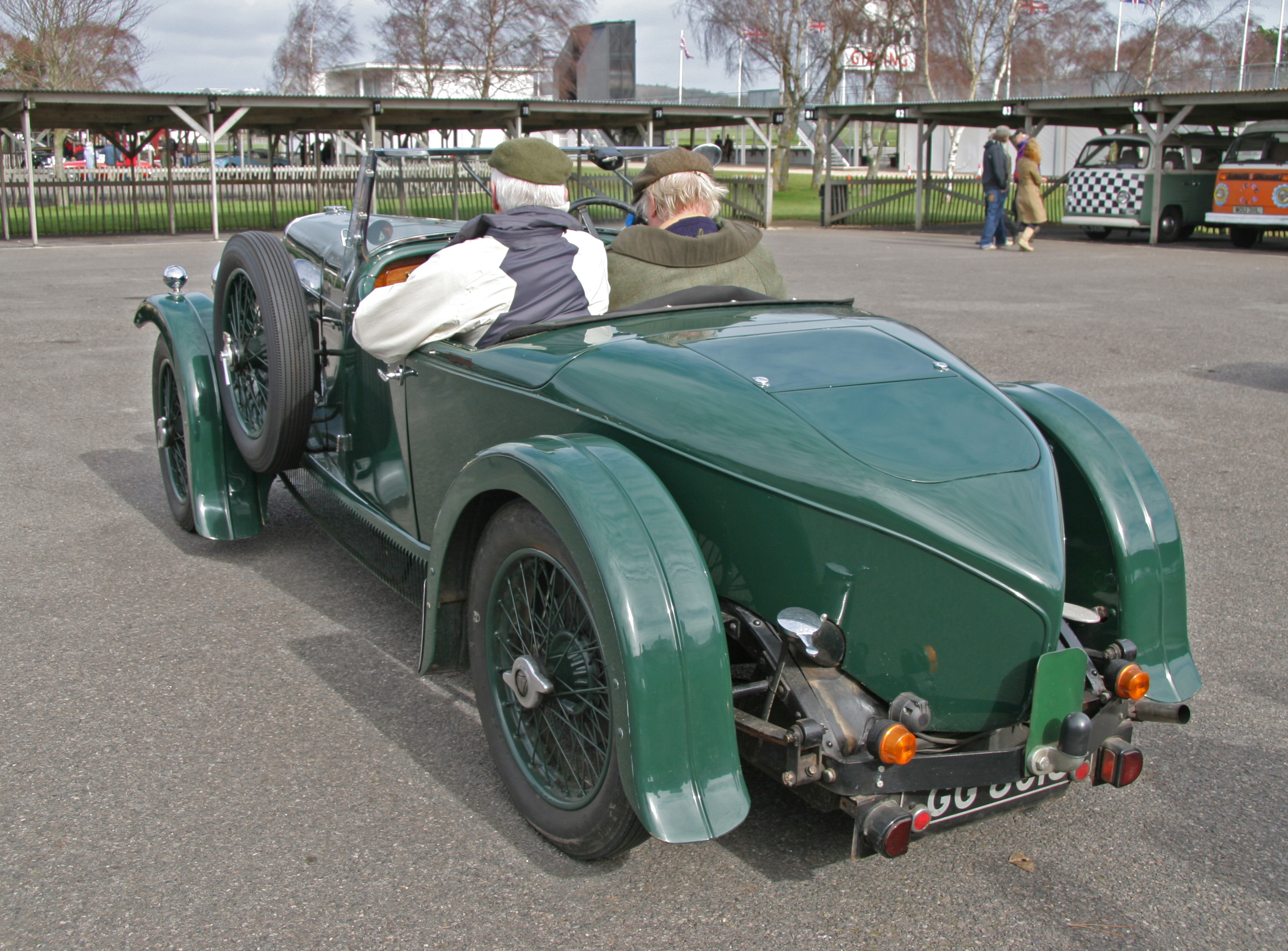
Alvis 12/60 Boattail Roadster (1932)

The 12/60 was offered in two versions, the TK and TL, which differed mainly in their wheels. The car had an inline four-cylinder engine with overhead valves. Unlike the 12/50 model, the 1,645 cc engine, equipped with two SU carburettors, produced 52 bhp (38 kW) at 4,500 rpm. The 12/60 was available as a two-door saloon or two-door Sports Tourer (roadster). The front and rear rigid axles were suspended on semi-elliptical leaf springs. The top speed, depending on the body type, was about 75 miles per hour (120 km/h). By 1932, 229 units had been produced.

In the Alvis model range, the 12/60 had neither a direct predecessor nor successor in the strictest sense. It took into account the fact that the 12/50 TJ model, introduced the previous year, was longer, more comfortable, heavier, and thus less sporty than its predecessor. The 12/60 indirectly continued the tradition of the 12/50 SD sports model, discontinued in 1929, and the short, front-wheel-drive Alvis 12/75 FA and FD models intended as its successors. Unlike these, however, it no longer fell in the popular 1.5-litre class, which was also important for motorsports. On the other hand, the 12/60 filled the gap that had arisen at the end of 1930, when the sporty six-cylinder Silver Eagle SD model was replaced by the longer and more comfortable Silver Eagle SE. After the 12/60, Alvis did not resume the tradition of a relatively compact, sportier four-cylinder model until 1937 with the 12/70.
