= Ty Tashiro =

Author and social scientist

Ty Tashiro is an author and social scientist. He received his PhD in psychology from the University of Minnesota and has taught at the University of Maryland and the University of Colorado.

He is the author of Awkward: The Science of Why We’re Socially Awkward and Why That’s Awesome (2017), in which he explains why some of the same characteristics that make people feel socially awkward can be the same traits that propel them toward extraordinary achievements. He is also the author of The Science of Happily Ever After (2013). He lives in New York City.
