= Robert Cobb =

Robert or Bob Cobb may refer to:

- Robert W. Cobb (fl. 2003–2009), US government official
- Robert Cobb (defensive end) (1957–1995), American football player
- Robert Cobb (quarterback) (1971–1999), American football player
- Robert H. Cobb, American restaurateur, founder of the Brown Derby, purported birthplace of the Cobb salad

Fictional characters

- Bob Cobb, the secret identity of Mon-El of the Legion of Superheroes when he lives in Smallville.
- Bob Cobb (Seinfeld) or "the Maestro", a minor character from the American TV sitcom Seinfeld
