= Charles G. Cobb =

American author, Agile Project Management expert and lecturer

- Born: 1945 (age 80–81); New Orleans, Louisiana, U.S.
- Education: United States Air Force Academy, Southern Methodist University (SMU), Northeastern University, Babson College
- Occupations: Author, agile project management expert and lecturer
- Known for: Founding the Agile Project Management Academy
- Notable work: The Project Manager's Guide to Mastering Agile: Principles and Practices for an Adaptive Approach, Charles G. Cobb, 2023

Charles G. Cobb (born 1945) is an American author, Agile Project Management expert and lecturer. He was a former United States Air Force officer and is the founder of the Agile Project Management Academy.

== Early life and education ==
Cobb was born in New Orleans, Louisiana, in 1945. In 1963 he won a competitive nomination to attend the United States Air Force Academy from Hale Boggs who was then the Speaker of the House of Representatives and he graduated in 1967 with a BS in Applied Sciences.

In 1970, as an Air Force officer, Cobb was selected for an Air Force Institute of Technology scholarship to attend Southern Methodist University (SMU) where he received his MSEE in 1971.

== Career ==
After graduating from SMU, Cobb was transferred to Hanscom Air Force Base in the Boston, MA area where he worked in the Electronic Systems Division on a variety of high-profile Air Force systems engineering projects. He was honorably discharged from the Air Force in 1974 with the rank of captain and was immediately hired by Digital Equipment Corporation (DEC) where he worked for 18 years. While he was at DEC, he received his MBA from Northeastern University in 1982.

In 1998, Cobb received a Certificate in Advanced Management and started his own consulting practice. In 2014, he founded the Agile Project Management Academy, an online Agile Project Management training platform.

Cobb is the author of The Project Manager's Guide to Mastering Agile: Principles and Practices for an Adaptive Approach 2nd Edition (2023), a graduate-level project management textbook which is in use in several universities across the globe. He has also written other published books and articles relating to Agile Project Management. and Business Excellence.
