= Howell Cobb (disambiguation) =

Howell Cobb (1815–1868) was an American political figure.

Howell Cobb may also refer to:

- Howell Cobb (born 1772) (1772–1818), American politician, farmer and soldier
- Howell Cobb (judge) (1922–2005), Texas lawyer and federal judge
- USS Howell Cobb (1861), a schooner acquired on an emergency temporary basis by the Union Navy from the U.S. Coast Survey during the start of the American Civil War
