= Margaret V. Cobb =

Educational psychologist

Margaret Cobb
- Born: 1884; Easthampton, Massachusetts, United States
- Died: 19 November 1963 (aged 78–79); Concord, New Hampshire, United States
- Education: Radcliffe College (BA); University of Illinois Urbana-Champaign (MA)

Margaret Vera Cobb (1884 – November 19, 1963) was an educational psychologist. She was elected a fellow of the American Association for the Advancement of Science in 1925.

== Education and career ==
Cobb was born in Easthampton, Massachusetts, in 1884. She received her bachelor's degree at Radcliffe College, where she graduated with distinction in 1910. At her graduation, the graduation speaker was Frederick Fish who spoke on how "women's specialization was the home". In 1913 she earned an MA from the University of Illinois Urbana-Champaign. Cobb also did research at the University of Michigan and the Marine Biological Laboratory. In 1918 she joined the United States Army to work in the Army Medical Department.

From 1922 until 1928, she worked in public schools in New York City teaching gifted children, which was described in a full-page article about her work in 1924. She was entered in the 1949 edition of American Men of Science.

Cobb died in Concord, New Hampshire, on November 19, 1963.

== Work ==
Cobb's work centered on psychology where she conducted studies on intelligence, specially the use of intelligence tests. In one of her studies, Cobb conducted a statistical analysis on the Medical Corps officers of the U.S. Army and found that they were of a lower intellectual status in general than the other branches of the Army. While they contributed this to the urgent necessity of Army medical officers during World War I and the increased average age of said officers, she concluded that analysis and considered other testing or more educational training that should done for entrance into medical school and the profession. Another article by Cobb found that how well a child could do simple mathematical calculations such as addition, subtraction, multiplication, and division correlated strongly with how well their parent could do the same activities. After controlling for environmental confounds, Cobb attributed her results to hereditary inheritance.

== Awards and honors ==
Cobb was named a fellow of the American Association for Advancement of Science in 1925.

== Publications ==
- Cobb, Margaret V. (1917). "A preliminary study of the inheritance of arithmetical abilities". Journal of Educational Psychology. 8 (1): 1–20. doi:10.1037/h0075614. ISSN 0022-0663.
- Cobb, Margaret V; Yerkes, Robert M; National Research Council (U.S.) (1921). Intellectual and educational status of the medical profession as represented in the United States Army. Washington, D.C.: Published by the National Research Council of the National Academy of Sciences. OCLC 808864870.
- Thorndike, Edward L; Cobb, Margaret V (2010). The psychology of algebra. Nabu Press. ISBN 978-1-174-93227-4. OCLC 773173878.
- Cobb, Margaret V; Hollingworth, Leta S (1925). "The regression of siblings of children who test at or above 135 I. Q.". Journal of Educational Psychology. 16 (1): 1–7. doi:10.1037/h0075303. ISSN 0022-0663. OCLC 4644342763.
- Cobb, Margaret V (1922). "The limits set to educational achievement by limited intelligence". Journal of Educational Psychology. 13 (9): 546–555. doi:10.1037/h0067893. ISSN 0022-0663. OCLC 4644336275.
- Thorndike, Edward L.; Bregman, E. O.; Cobb, M. V.; Woodyard, Ella; Inst of Educational Research Div of Psychology (1926). The measurement of intelligence. New York: Teachers College Bureau of Publications. doi:10.1037/11240-000.
