= Tyrus W. Cobb =

American lieutenant colonel and academic (1940–2024)

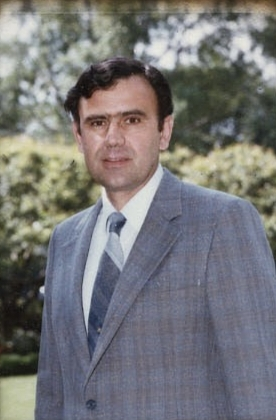
- Cobb in 1984

Special Assistant to the President for National Security Affairs
- In office July 15, 1988 – March 13, 1989
- President: Ronald Reagan
- Preceded by: Robert D. Blackwill
- Succeeded by: David Charles Miller Jr.

Personal details
- Born: Tyrus William Cobb; April 15, 1940 Reno, Nevada, U.S.
- Died: December 7, 2024 (aged 84) Reno, Nevada, U.S.
- Spouse: Suellen Small (m. 1965)
- Children: 3, including Ty
- Education: University of Nevada, Reno (BA); Indiana University Bloomington (M.A.); Georgetown University (PhD)

Military service
- Allegiance: United States
- Branch/service: Army
- Years of service: 1963–1987
- Rank: Lieutenant colonel
- Battles/wars: Vietnam War

Tyrus William Cobb (April 15, 1940 – December 7, 2024) was an American lieutenant colonel and academic who specialized in national security. Cobb was a member of the U.S. National Security Council, where he served as director of European and Soviet Affairs Directorate from 1983 until 1988 and special assistant to the president for national security affairs from 1988 until 1989. After the National Security Council, Cobb served on the boards of numerous non-profit organizations, including Business Executives for National Security, NatureBridge, American Armed Forces Mutual Aid Association and Big Brothers Big Sisters of Northern Nevada.

== Early life and education ==
Tyrus William Cobb was born in Reno, Nevada, on April 15, 1940. He was a fourth generation Nevadan. His father, Tyrus Richard, was a news anchor and he had two siblings. Cobb graduated from Reno High School in 1958.

Cobb graduated from the University of Nevada, Reno with a bachelor's degree. At Nevada, he was the president of Sigma Nu. Cobb completed postgraduate studies at Indiana University Bloomington, earning a Master of Arts degree in political science in 1970. He later attended Georgetown University for doctoral studies, earning a Doctor of Philosophy in Soviet studies.

== Career ==
=== Early career ===
Prior to his involvement with the National Security Council, Cobb was a lieutenant colonel in the army and a professor at the United States Military Academy. He served in the army from 1963 until his retirement in 1987. During his service in the army, Cobb served in two tours of duty in the Vietnam War, and was the recipient of the Purple Heart.

=== National Security Council career ===
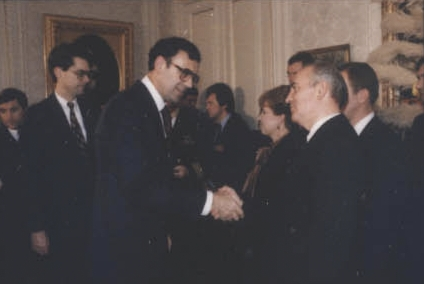
Cobb (third from left) with Mikhail Gorbachev (second from right) at the Geneva Summit in 1985

Cobb consulted with the U.S. National Security Council during the Carter and Reagan administrations on international energy issues. He was later asked to join the council as a member of the European and Soviet Affairs Directorate, succeeding Dennis C. Blair. At the directorate, Cobb advised on European affairs, Canada and Soviet policy. On July 15, 1988, he replaced Robert D. Blackwill as special assistant to the president and senior director of the International Programs and Technology Affairs Directorate. As special assistant, Cobb was responsible for science and technology agreements, export policy, United Nations affairs, and the environment. He was succeeded by David Charles Miller Jr. on March 13, 1989.

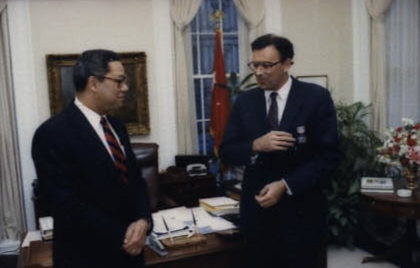
Cobb (right) with Colin Powell in 1988

=== Later career ===
After leaving the National Security Council, Cobb was the president and chief executive officer of Business Executives for National Security from 1991 until 1995, before leaving the position to serve as president and CEO of NatureBridge, a position he held until 2002.

Cobb retired to Reno in 2002, where he founded the National Security Forum, a non-profit organization that focuses on debate on national and international security issues. He was a member of the American Armed Forces Mutual Aid Association board of directors. Cobb was a member of the Big Brothers Big Sisters of Northern Nevada Advisory Committee. He retired from the National Security Council in 2018.

Cobb was appointed a civilian aide to the secretary of the Army in Nevada in 2005. He received the award Distinguished Nevadan from the University of Nevada, Reno in 2017.

Cobb's papers are in the collections of the University of Nevada, Reno, the Ronald Reagan Presidential Library and the Library of Congress.

== Personal life, death and legacy ==
Cobb married Suellen Small in 1965 and they had three children, along with five grandchildren. His son, Ty, served in the Nevada Assembly from 2006 until 2010.

Cobb had fluency in Russian and Italian.

Cobb died from heart failure in Reno, on December 7, 2024, at the age of 84.

In December 2019, the National Security Forum created the Ty Cobb UNR Scholarship in his honor, which is awarded annually.

== Bibliography ==
- Cobb, Tyrus W. (1981). The Future of the Soviet Defense Burden: The Political Economy of Contemporary Soviet Security Policy. Naval War College Review. Vol.34:4:5.
- Cobb, Tyrus W. (May 9, 2018). Reagan and the Russians. CreateSpace. ISBN 978-1979970174.
