= Judge Cobb =

Judge Cobb may refer to:

- Howell Cobb (judge) (1922–2005), judge of the United States District Court for the Eastern District of Texas
- Jia M. Cobb (born 1980), judge of the United States District Court for the District of Columbia
- Sir Stephen Cobb (judge) (born 1962), English Court of Appeal judge

== See also ==
- Justice Cobb (disambiguation)
