= Sue Cobb =

Sue Cobb could refer to:

- Sue M. Cobb (born 1937), American politician and diplomat
- Sue Bell Cobb (born 1956), American jurist
