= Leonie Cobb =

British naturalist and illustrator (1912–1984)

Leonie Elaine Cobb (1912–1984) was a British collector of herbarium specimens, naturalist, and conservationist.

== Personal life ==
Cobb was born at Duffryn Gardens, near Cardiff, to Arthur John Cobb and Marie Emma Cobb (née Low). Her father was a keen gardener and in 1919, the family moved to Shinfield, Berkshire, where Arthur lectured on Horticulture at the University of Reading, before ultimately moving to Reading upon his retirement in 1938.

Cobb was educated at the Covenant School before studying at the University of Reading with an Honours degree in French, subsequently earning further qualifications in German, Spanish, and Secretarial Studies.

From her passion of linguistics, Cobb became a member of a society which promoted Anglo-French relations, leading to her meeting the French President Albert Lebrun in London in 1939.

In 1939 Arthur Cobb took up a wartime appointment at Seale-Hayne Agricultural College where he died in 1940.

== Career ==
In 1936, Cobb worked for the Commonwealth Institute of Economic Entomology as an abstractor, writing abstracts for journal articles on beneficial and harmful insects to humans, animals, and crops until her retirement in 1976.

Cobb joined the Reading & District Natural History Society soon becoming involved in administration as a committee member. She served as treasurer in 1943-1947 and 1950–70, and President for 1970–1971. She served on the society's editorial sub-committee from its inception and was appointed honorary editor from 1978 until her death in 1984.

Cobb produced illustrations of flowering plants which appeared in the Atlas of the British Flora, the Flora of Berkshire, and the Flora of Oxfordshire.

The second journal published by the Reading & District Natural History Society was dedicated to the findings of Dr Hora on fungi of which Cobb assisted in his research for.

Cobb was a keen conservationist and one of the founder members of the Berkshire, Buckinghamshire, and Oxfordshire Naturalists' Trust, currently known as the Berks, Bucks & Oxon Wildlife Trust (BBOWT), a conservation charity that protects local wildlife, where she provided assistance in the field of several reserves.

== Later life and death ==
Upon her retirement, Cobb enjoyed various parish and church activities, renewing old friendships, and visiting old friends living away from Reading. Cobb remained a life-member of the National Trust.

In October 1984, Cobb died in Berkshire at the age of 72. Cobb bequeathed a collection of mosses in addition to a set of four albums to Reading Museum.
