= Melanie Cobb =

American biochemist

Melanie Cobb is an American biochemist, currently the Jane and Bill Browning Jr. Chair in Medical Science at University of Texas Southwestern Medical Center.
