= Wilbur Cobb =

Wilbur Cobb may refer to:

- Wilbur James Cobb or Jimmy Cobb (1929–2020), American jazz drummer
- Wilbur Cobb, character from The Ren & Stimpy Show animated series
