= Agnes Egan Cobb =

American businesswoman

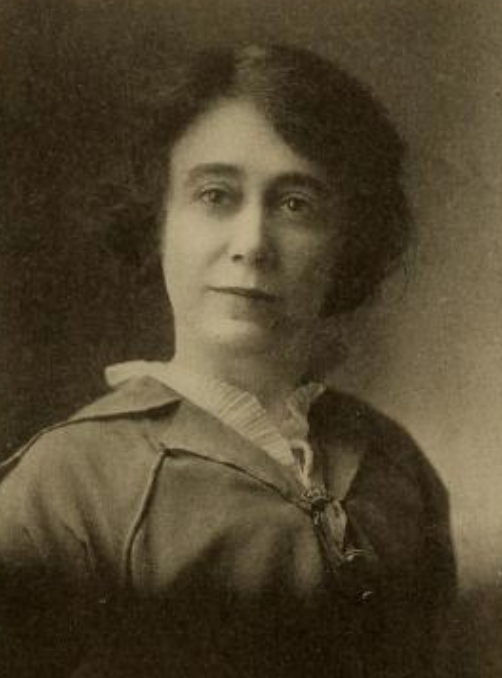
- Agnes Egan Cobb, from a 1913 publication
- Born: Agnes Veronica Egan; October 19, 1877; Brooklyn, New York
- Died: November 16, 1963 (age 86); Trumbull, Connecticut
- Occupation: Businesswoman

Agnes Egan Cobb (October 19, 1877 – November 16, 1963) was an American businesswoman based in New York City. Working with and running several companies in the 1910s and 1920s, she bought and distributed silent films to theaters across the United States, and supplied exhibitors with promotional materials such as posters.

== Early life and education ==
Agnes Veronica Egan was born in Brooklyn, the daughter of Francis Michael Egan and Josephine Kingston Egan. Her father was a harbor pilot, born in Ireland. She attended Mount Holyoke Seminary, but left before graduation, after her father died.

== Career ==
Cobb worked as a stenographer, and as the secretary of a copper mining promoter in Mexico, as a young woman. She also made forays into publishing and film production. She was a sales agent and manager of the features department of the Leading Players Film Corporation, and American sales manager of the Eclair Film Company. Her work involved extensive travel, booking feature films into theaters across the United States, and supplying exhibitors with promotional materials such as posters.

In 1913, she and her second husband founded the Cobb Motion Picture Bureau, to sell films to regional and state-level exchanges. In 1915 she also managed the Egan Film Company, taking charge when her brother fell ill. In 1916 she became vice-president and general manager of Claridge Films. She also wrote and produced a film, America Preparing (1916).

In 1919 she became a sales manager for Schomer and Ross Productions. In 1922, she became sales manager for Concord Film Company.

== Publications ==
- "Parisian Fashions in Motion Pictures" (1914)

== Personal life ==
Agnes Egan married William Hoffman in 1898, and had a daughter, Josephine. Her first husband died in 1901. She married again in 1912, to fellow sales agent Charles Lang Cobb Jr. Cobb retired in the 1930s, lived in Larchmont, New York for a time. Her daughter died in 1953; she lived with her daughter's family in her later years. She died in 1963, at the age of 86, in Trumbull, Connecticut.
