= Thomas Tracy Cobb =

American politician

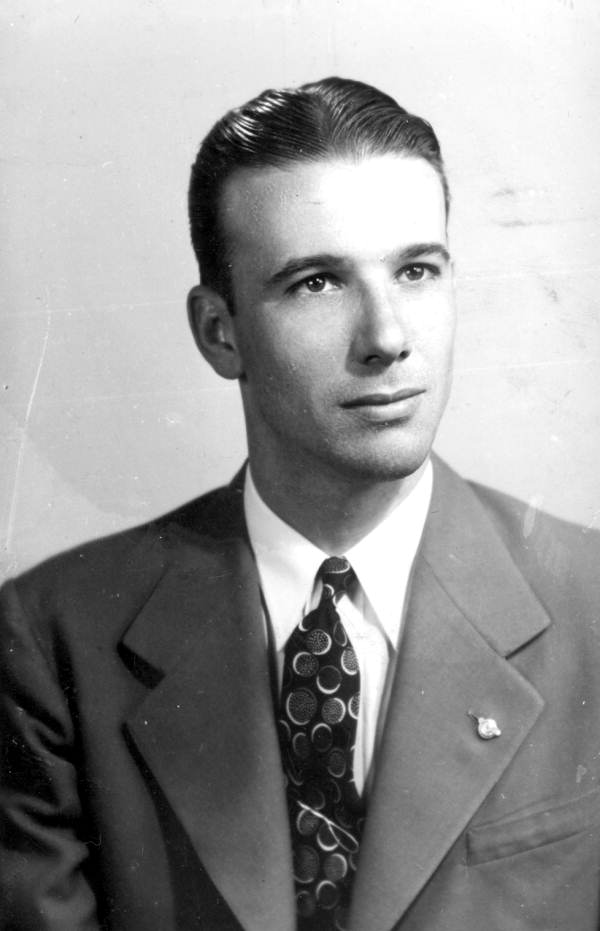
- Cobb in 1947

Member of the Florida House of Representatives from Volusia County
- In office 1947–1956

Personal details
- Born: November 13, 1916 Washington, D.C., U.S.
- Died: November 5, 2004 (aged 87)
- Party: Democratic
- Education: Stetson University

Thomas Tracy Cobb (November 13, 1916 – November 5, 2004) was an American politician. He served as a Democratic member of the Florida House of Representatives.

== Life and career ==
Cobb was born in Washington, D.C. He attended Stetson University, graduating in 1939 with a degree in law. Cobb would go on to join his father at Cobb Cole Law Firm before taking over the practice seven months later upon his father's death. He joined the US Navy in 1944 serving until 1945.

Cobb was elected as a representative to the Florida House of Representatives in 1947 serving to 1956. During his time in office, Cobb helped to pass legislation to establish a special district in Daytona Beach which would later be the home of Daytona International Speedway.

Cobb died in November 2004 of pneumonia, at the age of 87.
