= Humphry Cobb =

English cricketer

Humphry Henry Cobb (12 July 1873 – 13 December 1949) was an English first-class cricketer active 1896–1901 who played for Middlesex. He was born in Kensington; died in Camber.
