= Randall Cobb =

Randall Cobb may refer to:

- Randall "Tex" Cobb (born 1950), American fighter/actor
- Randall Cobb (American football) (born 1990), American football player
