= Cobbs =

Cobbs is a surname, and may refer to

- Arnett Cobb (1918–1989), American jazz saxophonist born Arnette Cleophus Cobbs
- Bill Cobbs (1934–2024), American actor
- Blair Cobbs (born 1989), American boxer
- Call Cobbs Jr. (1911–1971), American jazz organist
- Clarence H. Cobbs (1908–1979), American clergyman and broadcaster
- Janet Cobbs (born 1967), American volleyball player
- Paul M. Cobbs (1838-1890), American state legislator in Arkansas
- Simmie Cobbs Jr. (born 1995), American football player
- Tasha Cobbs (born 1981), gospel musician
- Willie Cobbs (1932–2021), blues musician

== See also ==
- Cobbs Cross, Antigua and Barbuda
- Cobbs Lake Creek, Canada
- Cobbs Creek, Philadelphia, Pennsylvania
- Cobb (disambiguation)
- Cobb (surname)
