= Center of balance =

Center of balance is an object's center of mass.

Center of balance may also refer to:

- Center point of balance in dancing
- Center of balance (horse), a place on the horse back that projects onto its center of mass
- "Center of Balance", a song by John Norum first released on the 1996 album Worlds Away
