= Sara Maxson Cobb =

American art teacher, artist and writer

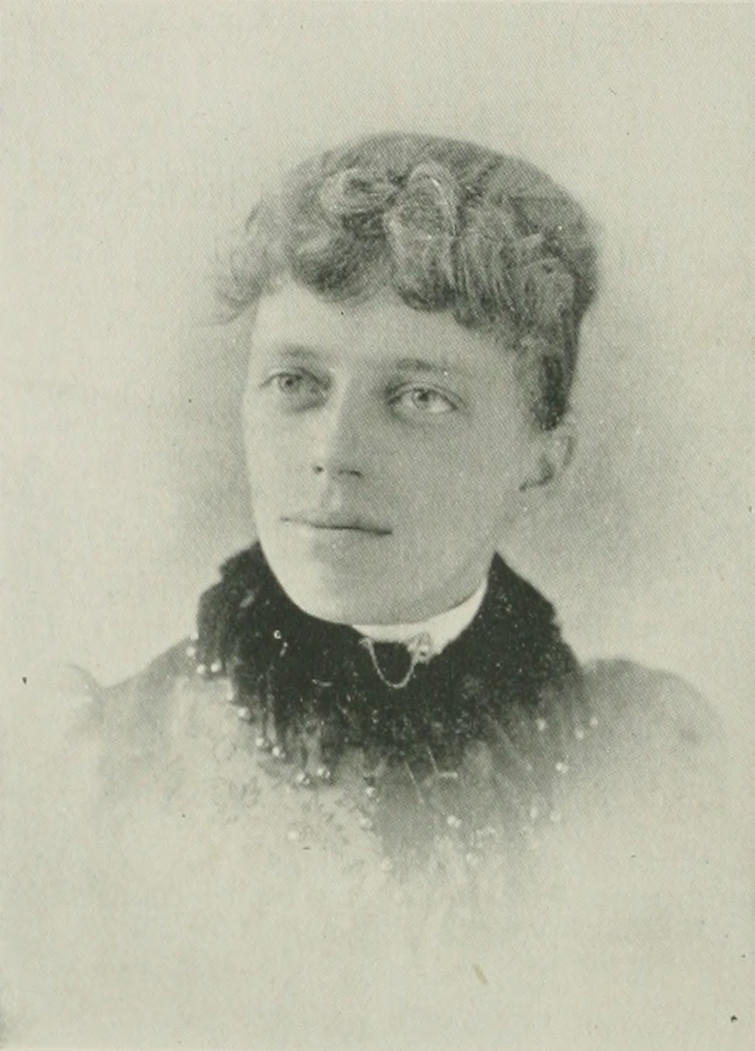
- Born: Sara Miranda Maxson; September 30, 1858; Geneva, New York
- Died: January 24, 1917 (aged 58); Chicago, Illinois
- Spouse: Herbert Edgar Cobb

Academic background
- Education: Hungerford Collegiate Institute
- Alma mater: Syracuse University

Academic work
- Discipline: Art History
- Institutions: Maine Wesleyan Seminary and Female College; Colorado State University

Sara Miranda Cobb (née Maxson; also known as Sara Maxson Cobb and Sara M. Maxson-Cobb; September 30, 1858 – January 24, 1917) was a 19th-century American art teacher, artist, and writer from the U.S. state of New York. She served as director of the Art School of the Maine Wesleyan Seminary and Female College at Kents Hill, Maine, and taught drawing at Colorado State University.

== Early years and education ==
Sara Miranda Maxson was born in Geneva, New York, September 30, 1858, the daughter of Dr. Edwin R. and Lucy (Lanphear) Maxson. She traces her lineage on her father's side to the Maxtons, of Maxton-on-the-Tweed, in Scotland. Her father's family came to America in 1701, after having been settled in England for generations. Her father, Edwin Robinson Maxson, A.M., M.D., LL.D., a graduate of Jefferson Medical College, Philadelphia, Pennsylvania, had been a lecturer on medical subjects in the colleges of Philadelphia and Geneva. His Practice of Medicine and Hospitals: British, French and American were well-known books. Her mother, Lucy Potter Lamphere, was of French-English ancestry.

In 1864, the family removed to Adams, New York, where Cobb spent much of her childhood. Her earliest education was received from her parents. When very young, she started writing for amateur papers. At the age of eight, happening to read an article on drawing, she tried her pencil at reproducing the simple cuts given in it for copying, with a success so surprising to herself that she then and there resolved to become an artist. Thereafter, she received training in drawing. In 1872, Cobb entered the Hungerford Collegiate Institute at Adams, where she studied for two years. The family removed to Syracuse. New York, in 1874, where, for five years, she studied in the public schools of that city, graduating at the Syracuse High School in 1879. For the next four years she was in the Liberal Art College of Syracuse University, where she graduated with the degree of Ph. B., in 1883. She then took up the painting course in the Fine Art College of the university, graduating with the degree of Bachelor of painting in 1886. In 1890. Syracuse Universitv granted her the degree of PhD, on examination in Art History. She was a member of the Alpha chapter of the college society, Alpha Phi.

== Career ==
Through the late Chancellor C. N. Sims of the university, she obtained the position of director of the Art School of the Maine Wesleyan Seminary and Female College at Kents Hill, Maine, a position she held from 1886 to 1890. During that time, in 1888, she was one of a large party to visit the United Kingdom and France.

In 1890, she was married to Professor Herbert Edgar Cobb, a member of the faculty at the Maine Wesleyan Seminary and a graduate of the Wesleyan University at Middletown, Connecticut. In the same year, her husband was called to a position on the faculty of the Colorado State University. At this university Mrs. Cobb was a teacher of drawing from 1890 to 1892. In the latter year, she and her husband removed to Chicago, where her husband was employed for a time in the Extension Department of the University of Chicago, afterwards receiving a position on the faculty of the Lewis Institute, where he headed the Mathematical Department. In 1906 and 1907, her husband had leave of absence from the Lewis Institute, to pursue higher mathematical studies at the University of Berlin. She accompanied her husband on this trip, and taking art lectures at the University of Berlin.

== Personal life ==
Cobb was engaged in philanthropic work and the study of social science since 1892. A strong literary taste and sympathy for active philanthropic and Christian enterprise led her into many additional types of work. Her numerous poems, stories told in verse, translations from the German, travel correspondence, and articles on art subjects were included in prominent publications. Cobb was a believer in united action, and in the many societies to which she belonged, missionary, temperance, art, literary and scientific, she was recognized as a superior organizer and leader. Geology, microscopy and photography claimed a share of her attention, and she had an interesting collection of specimens of her own finding, slides of her own mounting and photographs of her own taking. She delighted in music and had a cultivated contralto voice.

Cobb died January 24, 1917, aged 58, from apoplexy at the Frances Willard Hospital in Chicago, Illinois, after a very brief illness, and was buried in Union Cemetery, Adams Center, New York.
