= Denise LeClair Cobb =

American former CNN and CNN Headline News anchor

Denise LeClair Cobb is an American former CNN and CNN Headline News anchor. She was one of the original CNN anchors when it launched in 1980 and was the first person to speak on air when Headline News (then CNN2) launched.

== Career ==
When Cobb left CNN, she joined News Travel Network as a correspondent and producer. In that capacity, she traveled the country and the world reporting on travel and tourism for television stations across the United States and overseas

She currently serves on the board of Career Transition For Dancers, an organization that helps dancers establish post-performance careers. She is also very active with the Naples Children and Education Foundation, where she was a founding trustee.

Cobb and her husband, Brian, were named the 2004 "Philanthropists of the Year" by the Community Foundation of Collier County, Southwest Florida Community Foundation and the Naples chapter of the Association of Fundraising Professionals. Cobb was named a Woman of the Year by Gulfshore Life in 2000.
