= West Coast University =

Private, for-profit university focused on healthcare located in California

- Type: Private, for-profit
- Established: 1909 (Original), 1997 (Los Angeles, California)
- Chairman: David A. Pyle
- Location: Irvine, California, United States
- Campus: Los Angeles, California Ontario, California Anaheim, California Richardson, Texas Doral, Florida
- Website: westcoastuniversity.edu

West Coast University (WCU) is a private, for-profit university focused on healthcare degrees with campus locations in Los Angeles, Anaheim, and Ontario, California; Richardson, Texas; and Miami, Florida. David Pyle founded American Career College in 1979 under the name of American College of Optics. Originally the school focused only on optical dispensing. In May 1997, Pyle purchased West Coast University, which was chartered by the State of California in 1909, out of bankruptcy, and developed a program for the training of registered nurses.

== History ==
West Coast University, in Los Angeles, was spun off from Occidental College by faculty who wanted more secular curricula. At the time, Occidental College was a Presbyterian Seminary. It was chartered by the State of California in 1909 as a small ophthalmology school. Over the next 50 years, its program offerings varied from aeronautical engineering applied sciences and mathematics to locomotive diesel engine repairs. As it developed, West Coast University became one of the forerunners in offering bachelor's degree programs designed to meet the needs of working adults to aid their careers. These programs were offered in non-traditional settings. For example, in 1953, the university began offering evening-only programs based on a schedule of six two-month academic terms, especially for service members taking advantage of the GI bill. The success of this approach led the university to expand and diversify its programs to include offerings in the areas of business and management, computer science, industrial technology, and pre-health science. Associate degrees in Science and master's degree programs, were introduced in the 1960s and 1970s. In 1981, the university reorganized into three distinct colleges: the College of Business and Management, the College of Engineering, and the College of Letters and Sciences. The university was led by the late Dr. Victor Elconin, whose direction was instrumental in developing its solid reputation in the business and academic community.

West Coast University eventually grew to three campuses in Los Angeles, Orange, and Lompoc. In-plant programs were offered to several companies, and Vandenberg Air Force Base.

After Victor Elconin retired, Bernard Cohlan was president for one year, followed by Robert M. L. Baker. Financial mismanagement led to loss of accreditation from the Western Association of Schools and Colleges, which resulted in severe declines in enrollment of international students, especially from Taiwan and Thailand. The result was bankruptcy in 1996.

In May 1997, American Career College bought the name and the responsibility to provide transcripts for ten years, from the bankruptcy trustee. WCU was reorganized under the leadership of its current Chairman, David Pyle. The new leadership team was committed to refocusing the institution's offering of programs to those that were highest in demand and would be most beneficial to working adults. Therefore, educating health care professionals became the university's singular focus in 2004. Just four years later, West Coast University became the first privately held proprietary university in California approved to offer a Bachelor of Science degree in Nursing. In 2009, the university achieved additional programmatic accreditation for the Bachelor of Science in Nursing program at their California campuses from the Commission on Collegiate Nursing Education (CCNE). That same year, WCU was awarded initial accreditation by the Commission on Dental Accreditation (CODA) to offer a Bachelor of Science Degree in Dental Hygiene in Orange County. WCU's Dental Hygiene program is one of only 4 CODA-accredited bachelor's degree in Dental Hygiene programs offered in California. West Coast University chose Henry Schein to design a new dental hygiene teaching facility in its Anaheim, California campus which opened its doors on 13 April 2009.

West Coast University's Los Angeles campus received approval in 2010 to award Master of Science degrees in Nursing and Health Care Management. That same year, the advanced Simulation Center for Nursing opened at the Orange County campus. The Simulation Center is built into the nursing curriculum and features high-fidelity mannequins that mimic human responses and current health care technology in realistic patient care settings. A year later, Simulation Centers were opened in the Los Angeles and Ontario campuses.

West Coast University has been a participant in the Yellow Ribbon GI Education Enhancement Program (Yellow Ribbon Program or YRP) since 2010.

In 2011, the university achieved institutional accreditation through the WASC Senior College and University Commission.

West Coast University opened a campus in Dallas, Texas in 2012. WCU-Dallas is located in the Dallas Fort Worth Metroplex, features a Simulation Center, and is the university's first Texas campus. The Master of Science in Nursing degree received additional accreditation by CCNE, Commission on Collegiate Nursing Education.

One notable alumnus of WCU is Greg Jarvis, one of the astronauts on the Space Shuttle Challenger. He was scheduled to receive his diploma, for a management science degree, on the shuttle, and would have been the first person to receive a degree in space. To honor his memory, West Coast University posthumously awarded Jarvis with a distinguished alumnus award on 15 May 2011. The university also offers a scholarship in Jarvis' name.

In 2013, West Coast University launched Global Public Health programs. Today, students have traveled to Panama, Costa Rica, Belize, Moldova, and Argentina. West Coast University's Los Angeles campus received approval by WASC for a Master of Science in Occupational Therapy, Doctor of Physical Therapy, and Doctor of Pharmacy programs. In 2014, the MSOT, DPT and PharmD programs were launched.

In 2015, WCU launched the 100% online, 12-month RN to BSN, 24-month RN to MSN and 24-month MSN programs.

== Campuses ==
West Coast University has five locations. The Los Angeles campus is located in North Hollywood. The Orange County campus is located in Anaheim, California. The Ontario campus is located in Ontario, California. The Texas campus is located in Richardson, Texas. The Miami campus is located in Doral, Florida.

Each campus includes classrooms, computer labs, science labs, skills labs, and advanced Simulation Centers. WCU boasts high-tech facilities at its Simulation Centers for Nursing and its no-cost community Dental Hygiene Clinic in Orange County, where students provide care and practice their skills at no cost to actual patients in disadvantaged populations.

== Accreditation ==
West Coast University is accredited by the WASC Senior College and University Commission.

The Bachelor of Science and Master of Science in Nursing programs, are approved by the California Board of Registered Nursing. The nursing programs at the Dallas campus are approved by the Texas Board of Nursing and the nursing programs at the Miami campus are approved by the Florida Board of Nursing.

The university's BSN and MSN programs achieved programmatic accreditation by the Commission on Collegiate Nursing Education (CCNE).

The Bachelor of Science in Dental Hygiene program is accredited by the Commission on Dental Accreditation (CODA).

West Coast University School of Pharmacy's Doctor of Pharmacy Program is accredited by the Accreditation Council for Pharmacy Education.
