= Cobb, West Virginia =

Unincorporated community in West Virginia, United States

- Unincorporated community
- Location within West Virginia Location within the United States
- Coordinates: 38°05′08″N 80°35′17″W
- Country: United States
- State: West Virginia
- County: Greenbrier
- Elevation: 3,261 ft (994 m)
- Time zone: UTC-5 (Eastern (EST))
  - Summer (DST): UTC-4 (EDT)
- Area codes: 304 & 681
- GNIS feature ID: 1550748

Cobb is an unincorporated community in Greenbrier County, West Virginia, United States. It is located 7 miles (11 km) east-northeast of Quinwood.
