= Camilla Cobb =

Camilla Cobb (1843–1933) was the founder of the first kindergarten in Utah.

== Early life and marriage ==
Camilla Cobb was born Camilla Clara Mieth in Dresden, Germany. Her older sister, Anna, was married to Karl G. Maeser. Cobb joined the Church of Jesus Christ of Latter-day Saints in 1855 and emigrated to the United States with the Maeser family on the packet ship Tuscarora in 1857. She arrived in Utah in 1860.

Four years later, in 1864, Camilla married James T. Cobb (1833–1910), a man who had been baptized after his arrival in Utah by Karl G. Maeser. James Cobb taught under Maeser at the 15th Ward School. James and Camilla Cobb went on to become the parents of seven children.

== Career as an educator ==
In 1874, while in New York and surrounding areas visiting her husband's relatives, Cobb went to New Jersey and was trained as a kindergarten teacher in a system run by Adolph Douai. Upon her return to Utah in the fall of 1874 she founded a kindergarten in Salt Lake City with the help of John W. Young. The following year she wrote an article in the Woman's Exponent explaining the importance of kindergarten. She maintained her school as a kindergarten for two years, and later opened it to children of all ages. Among her students was Heber J. Grant, who would later be president of the LDS Church.

== Church leadership ==
When the Salt Lake Stake primary was first organized in 1880, Cobb was made a counselor in its presidency. She remained in this position until 1896, when she was made president of the Salt Lake Stake primary, overseeing the LDS primary in all of Salt Lake County. At that point the Salt Lake primary had 46 associations, nearly 4,000 children, and 309 adults holding teaching or other positions. Cobb served as head of the Salt Lake Stake primary until the Salt Lake Stake was divided in 1904.

Beginning in 1898 Cobb served as a member of the Primary General Board. She remained on the general board until 1917.
