= Samuel Cobb =

Samuel Cobb may refer to:

- Samuel Cobb (poet) (c. 1675–1713), English poet, school master, classicist, and translator of Chaucer
- Samuel C. Cobb (1826–1891), American politician, mayor of Boston

== See also ==
- Samuel Cobb House, Portland, Oregon
- USNS Samuel L. Cobb, an American transport ship
