= Governor Cobb =

Governor Cobb may refer to:

- Howell Cobb (1815–1868), 40th Governor of Georgia
- Rufus W. Cobb (1829–1913), 25th Governor of Alabama
- William T. Cobb (1857–1937), 46th Governor of Maine
