= Maud Barker Cobb =

American librarian (1872–1925)

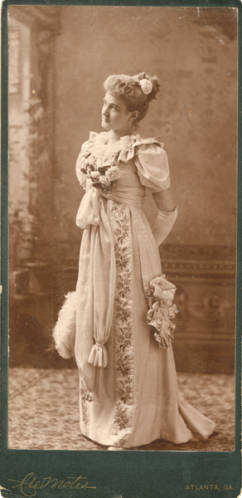
- Born: February 3, 1872; Toledo
- Died: December 27, 1925 (aged 53); Atlanta
- Occupation: Librarian

Maud Barker Cobb (February 3, 1872 – December 27, 1925) was an American librarian who was the first woman to hold public office in Georgia. She served as the State Librarian of Georgia from 1904 to 1925.

== Biography ==
Maud Barker Cobb was born on February 3, 1872, in Toledo, Iowa, the daughter of Charles P. N. Barker and Charlotte Carpenter Barker. She attended the Lucy Cobb Institute in Athens, Georgia. In 1891, she married lawyer Thomas Reade Rootes (T.R.R.) Cobb, the namesake and grand nephew of the school's founder, Thomas Reade Rootes Cobb. They had two children, Thomas Reade Rootes Cobb (1896–1985) and Howell N. Cobb (1898–1966). Her husband died in 1898, leaving her to raise their sons.

The next year, she began working as an assistant at the Carnegie Library of Atlanta. She served as the Postmistress of the Georgia General Assembly from 1900 to 1903. In January 1904, she was appointed Assistant State Librarian. In March 1908, she was appointed State Librarian, and continually reappointed until she died on December 27, 1905.

She was the first woman to serve as State Librarian of Georgia, and the first to hold public office in Georgia
