= Lyman Cobb =

Writer of spelling books (1800–1864)

Lyman Cobb (1800 – 1864) was the leading competitor of Noah Webster as an author of spelling books. Cobb's speller, A Just Standard for Pronouncing the English Language, was originally published in 1821 when the author was a young teacher in upstate New York. The book, issued by Spencer & Stockton of Ithaca, New York, lifted heavily from The Columbian Spelling-Book published by Daniel Crandall in Cooperstown, New York, in 1819. However, it was Cobb's book, not Crandall's, that became a success.

Cobb's book, revised and reprinted, sold about 4 million copies into the 1850s and was the chief competitor of Webster's very successful spelling book from about 1825 to 1845. With the notoriety gained from his speller, Cobb moved to New York City in the 1820s, continued to produce a variety of school textbooks and became a leading opponent of corporal punishment in schools. He died impoverished in 1864 in Colesburg, Pennsylvania, and lies in an unmarked grave.
