= Margaret C. Cobb =

Geologist

- Born: September 17, 1892; Lincolnton, North Carolina
- Died: May 28, 1975 (aged 82)
- Education: North Carolina Normal and Industrial College; Barnard College; Columbia University; Bryn Mawr College
- Scientific career
- Thesis: The origin of corundum associated with dunite in Western North Carolina (1924)

Margaret Cameron Cobb was a petroleum geologist. She was named a fellow of the American Association for the Advancement of Science in 1931.

== Education and career ==
Cobb was born in Lincolnton, North Carolina in 1892. She received an A.B. from North Carolina Normal and Industrial College (now known as the University of North Carolina at Greensboro) in 1912. Cobb taught in schools in Norfolk, Virginia from 1912 until 1914 before moving to Barnard College where she received an A.B. in 1915. From 1915 until 1916 she did graduate studies at Columbia University working with Ida Helen Ogilvie, Charles Peter Berkey, Douglas Wilson Johnson, and Amadeus William Grabau.

Cobb did two fellowship studies at Bryn Mawr College first earning a fellowship in 1916, and then returning for study there from 1919 until 1920. In between she taught at Mount Holyoke College from 1917 until 1919. While at Bryn Mawr, and she worked with Florence Bascom, Thomas Clachar Brown, Malcolm Havers Bisseil, and James Llewellyn Crenshaw. She received her Ph.D. from Bryn Mawr College in 1924, and then began work with the Amerada Petroleum Corporation.

Cobb's translation of Elements of Geophysics as Applied to Explorations for Minerals, Oil And Gas was reviewed in Science in 1932.

Cobb died on May 28, 1975.

== Selected publications ==
- Cobb, Margaret C. (1925). "Desilicated genesis of commercial corundum". Pan-Am. Geologist. 43: 257.

== Awards and honors ==
Cobb was named a fellow of the American Association for the Advancement of Science in 1931, and was in the 1949 edition of American Men of Science.
