= Justice Cobb =

Justice Cobb may refer to:

- Amasa Cobb (1823–1905), associate justice and chief justice of the Nebraska Supreme Court
- Andrew J. Cobb (1857–1925), associate justice of the Supreme Court of Georgia
- Kay B. Cobb (1942–2023), associate justice of the Supreme Court of Mississippi
- Nelson Cobb (1811–1894), associate justice of the Kansas Supreme Court
- Osro Cobb (1904–1996), associate justice of the Arkansas Supreme Court
- Sue Bell Cobb (born 1956), chief justice of the Supreme Court of Alabama

== See also ==
- Judge Cobb (disambiguation)
