= John Cobb =

Johnny or John Cobb may refer to:

== Politicians ==
- John Cobb (Canadian politician) (1903–1959), member of Legislative Assembly of Manitoba
- John Cobb (Australian politician) (born 1950), member of Australian House of Representatives

== Scholars ==
- John Cobb (academic) (1678–1725), English warden of New College, Oxford
- John Nathan Cobb (1868–1930), American fisheries researcher
- John Robert Cobb (1903–1967), American orthopedic surgeon and academic
- John B. Cobb (1925–2024), American theologian, philosopher, and environmentalist

== Other ==
- John Cobb (cabinetmaker) (c.1710–1778), English upholsterer
- John Cobb (pioneer) (1814–1893), American settler in California
- John Cobb (racing driver) (1899–1952), English record holder motorist
- Jack Cobb (1904–1966), American college basketball player
- Johnny Cobb, American songwriter on 1981 album Brothers of the Road
- Capt. John Addison Cobb (1788–1855), American, early settler in Georgia (U.S. state) in Americus

== Characters ==
- Johnny Cobb, protagonist of 1968 Western Firecreek, played by James Stewart

== See also ==
- NOAAS John N. Cobb, American fisheries research ship in service 1950–2008
- John Cobbe (1859–1944), Irish-born New Zealand politician
- John Cobb Cooper (1887–1967), American jurist, airline executive and presidential advisor
- Cobb (surname)
