= Willie Cobb =

American baseball player

- Outfielder

Negro league baseball debut
- 1908, for the Cuban Giants

Last appearance
- 1909, for the Birmingham Giants

Teams
- Cuban Giants (1908); Birmingham Giants (1909)

Willie Cobb was an American Negro league outfielder in the 1900s.

Cobb played for the Cuban Giants in 1908, and for the Birmingham Giants the following season. In six recorded games, he posted nine hits in 25 plate appearances.
