= Henry H. Cobb =

U.S. Army officer

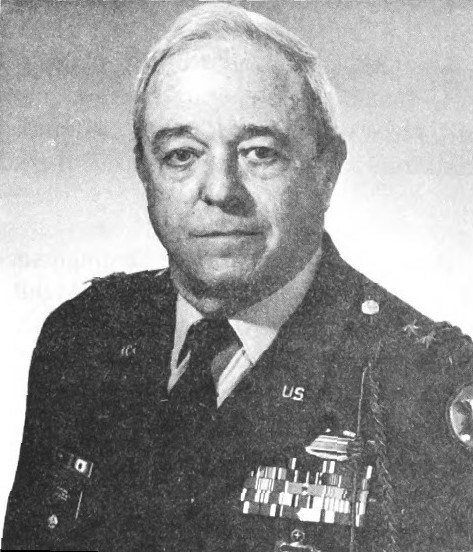
- Born: October 8, 1920; Birmingham, Alabama
- Died: February 7, 2013 (aged 92)
- Allegiance: United States of America
- Branch: United States Army
- Service years: 1943–1983
- Rank: Major General
- Commands: Alabama National Guard; 20th Special Forces Group
- Conflicts: World War II; Korean War

Major General Henry Hammond Cobb Jr. (October 8, 1920 – February 7, 2013) was a U.S Army officer and businessman.

Cobb was educated at The Hill School and graduated from Princeton University in 1943 with a B.A. degree in economics. He began his army service in 1943 and served during both World War II and the Korean War.

As a forward observer with Company B, 42nd Field Artillery Battalion, 4th Infantry Division during the Battle of Hürtgen Forest in November 1944, Cobb repeatedly exposed himself to enemy fire while directing his company's artillery fire and was subsequently awarded the Distinguished Service Cross.

Cobb established and subsequently became the Commander of the 20th Special Forces Group (Airborne). He also served as the Adjutant General of the Alabama National Guard from 1979 to 1983.

After retirement from the military, Cobb worked at the New York Life Insurance Company and established the Southern Restaurant Group.

After his death in 2013, Cobb was interred at Elmwood Cemetery in Birmingham, Alabama.

== Decorations ==
- Distinguished Service Cross
- Purple Heart with two oak leaf clusters
