= Linda Cobb =

American writer and columnist

- Occupations: writer and television and radio personality
- Writing career
- Pen name: Queen of Clean
- Notable work: Talking Dirty With the Queen of Clean
- Website: queenofclean.com

Linda Cobb (born c. 1950) is an American writer and columnist who is known as the Queen of Clean. She is known for humor in her writing which focuses on difficult cleaning problems and cleaning solutions which are used everyday or inexpensive items like tea bags and Tang. She is also a featured guest on radio and television shows in the United States.

== Biography ==
Cobb was raised in Grosse Pointe, Michigan. When she was young, she wanted to be a chemical engineer, but didn't feel there were many opportunities for women in that occupation.

Cobb met her first husband, Bruce Dusette, in 1967. They later moved to Marysville and in 1981, her husband was diagnosed with leukemia and shortly after, Cobb gave birth to their stillborn baby. In 1982, she began to work at a large cleaning company, Moretz Cleaning. She also had a foster child, David, come to live with her in the same year. While she worked at the cleaning company, she learned many tricks and tips on how to clean almost anything. Many of the jobs her company specialized in included smoke and water damage. In 1991, she bought out the Moretz Cleaning company.

In 1994, she married John Cobb and moved to Phoenix, Arizona, in 1995. Cobb felt that there was a gap in housecleaning information being passed from one generation to the next. At the suggestion of a friend, she began a newsletter focusing on cleaning tips which led to her appearances on Arizona television and radio. She began to make regular appearances on the television show, "Good Morning Arizona." In her first appearance on "Good Morning Arizona" in 1997, she started her segment with the double entendre, "I'm the Queen of Clean and we're going to talk dirty today." Her segment on the show led to a Phoenix publisher offering her a book deal.

Cobb made national attention in the United States through the release of her first book, Talking Dirty With the Queen of Clean. This book was a bestseller in 2000 and two other books, Talking Dirty Laundry With the Queen of Clean and A Queen For All Seasons, were also on the New York Times Best Seller List. Talking Dirty also made the number one spot on the Publishers Weekly List during October, 2000. In 2002, she appeared on the Oprah Winfrey Show. Her editor, Brenda Copeland, says that Cobb's success is due to her personality which adds a twist of fun to the "drudgery" of cleaning.
