= Ty (surname) =

Ty is a surname. Notable people with the surname include:

- Eleanor Ty, Canadian professor of English and Film Studies
- George Ty (1932–2018), Chinese Filipino billionaire banker
- Thao Ty (died 1975), Laotian brigadier general

== See also ==
- Zheng (surname), spelled Ty in the Philippines
