= Joseph B. Cobb =

American writer and politician (1819–1858)

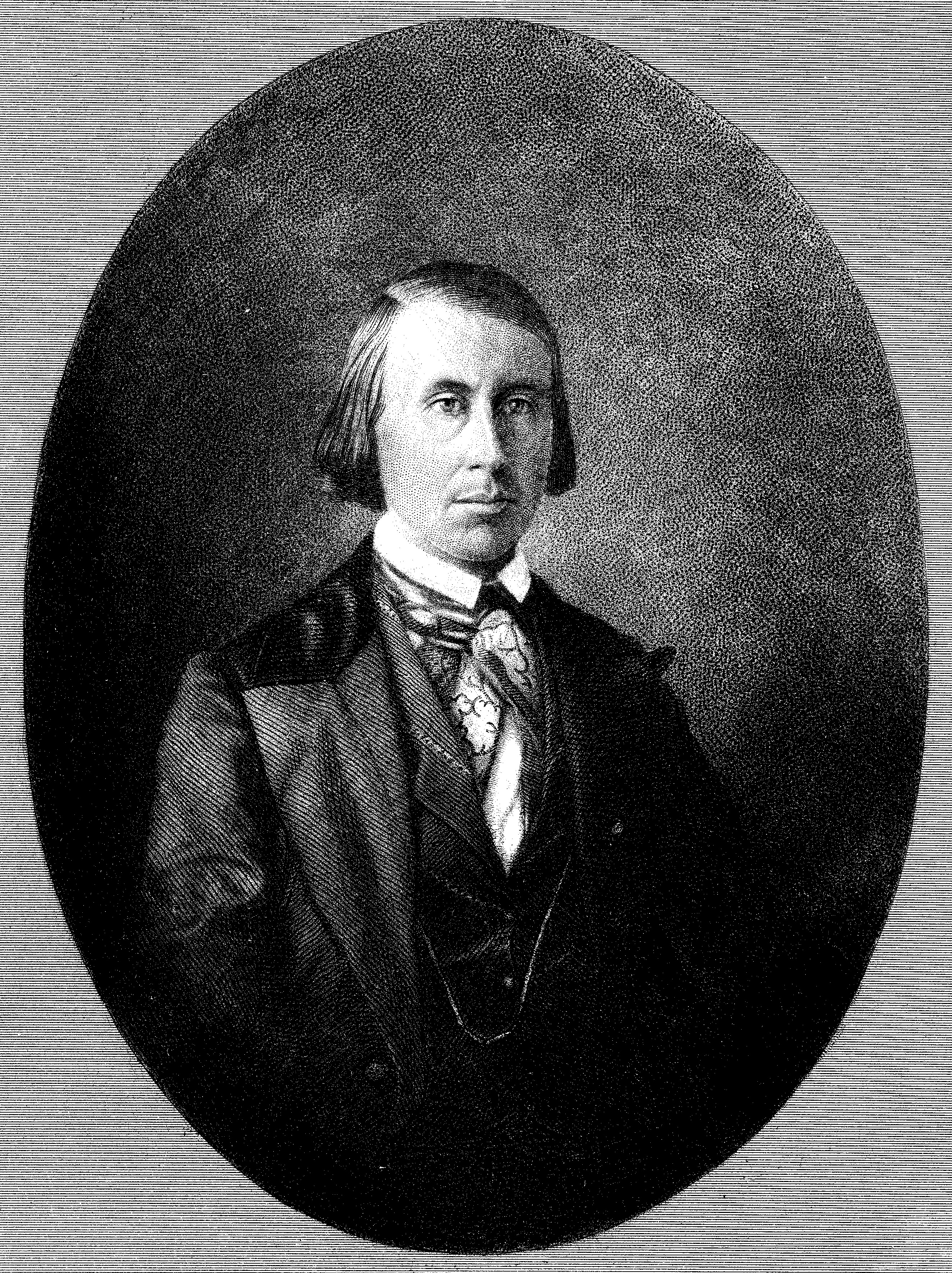
Cobb circa 1851

Joseph Beckham Cobb (April 11, 1819 – September 15, 1858) was an American writer and politician.

Joseph Beckham Cobb was born on April 11, 1819, in Oglethorpe County, Georgia; George T. Buckley identifies Cobb's birthplace as near Lexington, Georgia. His father was Thomas W. Cobb. He attended a school in Willington, South Carolina, and the University of Georgia (then called Franklin College), leaving in 1838 without a degree. He married Almira Clayton on October 5, 1837.

Cobb moved to Mississippi in 1838 and was elected to the Mississippi Legislature in 1841, resigning in 1843. By 1844 he lived in Columbus, Mississippi, where he held a plantation. As of his death in 1858, his $117,000 (~$3.29 million in 2024) estate included 1,500 acres of land and more than 100 enslaved persons.

Cobb published three books: The Creole (1850), a work of historical fiction; Mississippi Scenes (1851), a set of observations about people and culture in Columbus; and Leisure Labors (1858), an essay collection. He published essays in magazines as well. Jay Broadus Hubbell describes Cobb's politics as "typical of the wealthy Whig planters" in that he opposed secession of the South from the United States. In Mississippi Scenes, he wrote about Indigenous people, including Choctaw, and Black enslaved people, in highly derogatory terms.

Cobb died on September 15, 1858.

== Publications ==
- "Uncle Billy Brown" (1847)
- The Creole; or, Siege of New Orleans (1850)
- Mississippi Scenes; or, Sketches of Southern and Western Life (1851)
- Leisure Labors; or, Miscellanies Historical, Literary, and Political (1858)

== Works cited ==
- Buckley, George T. (May 1938). "Joseph B. Cobb: Mississippi Essayist and Critic". American Literature. 10 (2): 166–178. doi:10.2307/2920612. ISSN 0002-9831. JSTOR 2920612.
- Hubbell, Jay Broadus (1954). The South in American Literature, 1607–1900. Duke University Press. ISBN 0-8223-0091-5. OCLC 190791.
- Rogers, Tommy W. (1969). "Joseph B. Cobb: Antebellum Humorist and Critic". Mississippi Quarterly. 22 (2): 131–146. ISSN 0026-637X. JSTOR 26473790.
