= Thomas W. Cobb =

American politician (1784–1830)

Thomas Willis Cobb

United States Senator from Georgia
- In office December 6, 1824 – November 7, 1828
- Preceded by: Nicholas Ware
- Succeeded by: Oliver H. Prince

Member of the U.S. House of Representatives from Georgia's at-large district
- In office March 4, 1817 – March 3, 1821
- Preceded by: Wilson Lumpkin
- Succeeded by: Alfred Cuthbert
- In office March 4, 1823 – December 6, 1824
- Preceded by: New seat
- Succeeded by: Richard H. Wilde

Personal details
- Born: 1784 Columbia County, Georgia, US
- Died: February 1, 1830 (aged 45–46) Greensboro, Georgia, US
- Party: Democratic-Republican

Thomas Willis Cobb (1784 – February 1, 1830) was an American lawyer and politician who served as a United States Representative, United States Senator, and a judge in the Georgia State Superior Court. He was a prominent figure in Georgia politics during the aftermath of the Revolutionary War and played a role in the early development of the state's political institutions. Cobb County is named in his honor.

== Early life and education ==
Thomas Cobb was born sometime in 1784 in Columbia County, Georgia. He was a cousin of Howell Cobb, a Confederate General and Congressman, and Thomas R.R. Cobb, Confederate States Army Officer. Early on, he pursued preparatory studies and was admitted into the bar, eventually studying with William H. Crawford in Lexington, Georgia.

== Professional life ==
Thomas Cobb moved to Greensboro, Georgia, and was elected to the Fifteenth and Sixteenth Congresses (March 4, 1817 – March 3, 1821). He was unsuccessful in being elected into the Seventeenth Congress, but was elected to the Eighteenth Congress (March 4, 1823 – December 6, 1824). When Nicholas Ware, a U.S. Senator representing Georgia, died in September 1824, an election was held to replace the vacant spot and Thomas Cobb was elected. This meant he had to resign from his position as a representative. During this time, he served as a chairman of the Committee on Public Expenditures. He was affiliated with the Democratic-Republican Party and later aligned with Jacksonian Democrats.

He worked in the Senate from December 1824 until his resignation in 1828. The press announced that he would "probably resign" in August 1828. His successor, Oliver H. Prince, took office in November 1828. He later became a judge in the Superior Court of Georgia.

== Personal life ==
Thomas Cobb was the son of John Cobb and Elizabeth Beckham. He married Mary W. Moore (often referred to as Polly) on May 14, 1807, in Oglethorpe, Georgia. The two had several children; notably, one of them was Joseph Beckham Cobb who became a writer and politician in Mississippi.

== Death and legacy ==
On February 1, 1830, Thomas Cobb died while serving his seat in the Georgia Superior Court. The formation of Cobb County began in 1832 with the beginning of the Georgia Gold lottery of 1832. The county was named in honor of Thomas Willis Cobb, who had died two years earlier. The county seat, Marietta, is rumored to be named for his wife, Mary Moore Cobb.

U.S. House of Representatives
Preceded by Wilson Lumpkin	Member of the U.S. House of Representatives from Georgia's at-large congressional district March 4, 1817 – March 3, 1821	Succeeded by Alfred Cuthbert
Preceded by New seat	Member of the U.S. House of Representatives from Georgia's at-large congressional district March 4, 1823 – December 6, 1824	Succeeded by Richard H. Wilde
U.S. Senate
Preceded by Nicholas Ware	U.S. senator (Class 2) from Georgia; 1824–1828; Served alongside: John Elliott, John M. Berrien	Succeeded by Oliver H. Prince
