= Charley Cobb =

American football coach

Biographical details
- Born: November 8, 1929; Glasgow, West Virginia, U.S.
- Died: October 15, 2022 (aged 92); Burlington, North Carolina, U.S.

Coaching career (HC unless noted)
- 1960–1975: West Virginia Tech

Head coaching record
- Overall: 44–83–9

Charles Hartwell Cobb (November 8, 1929 – October 15, 2022) was an American football coach. He served as the head football at West Virginia University Institute of Technology in Montgomery, West Virginia for 16 seasons, from 1960 until 1975, compiling a record of 44–83–9.
