= Ty Cobb (politician) =

American politician (born 1975)

Member of the Nevada Assembly from the 26th district
- In office November 8, 2006 – November 3, 2010
- Preceded by: Sharron Angle
- Succeeded by: Randy Kirner

Personal details
- Born: Tyrus O. Cobb; 1975 (age 50–51) Fort Belvoir, Virginia
- Party: Republican
- Parent: Tyrus W. Cobb (father)

Tyrus O. Cobb (born 1975) is an American politician who served in the Nevada Assembly from the 26th district from 2006 to 2010.
