= Cobb baronets =

Title in the Baronetage of England, in the County of Oxford

The Cobb Baronetcy, of Adderbury in Oxfordshire, was a title in the Baronetage of England. It was created on 9 December 1662 for Thomas Cobb. The title became extinct on the death of the third Baronet on 29 March 1762.

== Cobb baronets, of Adderbury (1662) ==
Escutcheon of the Cobb baronets of Adderbury

- Sir Thomas Cobb, 1st Baronet (1627– February 1699)
- Sir Edward Cobb, 2nd Baronet (c. 1676–1744)
- Sir George Cobb, 3rd Baronet (c. 1670–29 March 1762)
