= Caedrel =

British esports personality (born 1996)

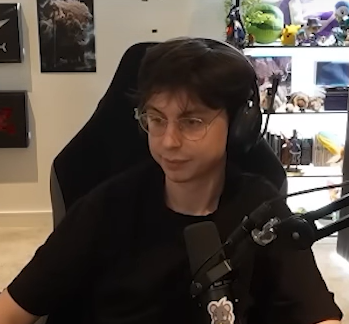
- Caedrel in 2025

Personal information
- Name: Marc Robert Lamont
- Born: 19 March 1996 (age 30); Doncaster, England
- Nationality: British

Career information
- Game: League of Legends
- Playing career: 2015–2020
- Role: Mid / Jungle
- Coaching career: 2024–2026

Team history

As player:
- 2015–2017: multiple teams
- 2017–2018: H2k-Gaming
- 2018: Diabolus Esports
- 2018: Ninjas in Pyjamas
- 2018: Team-LDLC
- 2018–2020: Excel Esports

As coach:
- 2024–2026: Los Ratones

Career highlights and awards
- As coach: 2x EMEA Masters champion (2025 Winter, 2025 Spring); 3x NLC champion (2025 Winter, 2025 Spring, 2025 Summer)
- Sports commentary career
- Sport: Esports
- Employer: Riot Games (2021–2023)

Twitch information
- Channel: Caedrel
- Years active: 2015–present
- Genres: Gaming; variety
- Followers: 1.7 million

YouTube information
- Channel: Caedrel
- Genres: Gaming; variety
- Subscribers: 639,000
- Last updated: 5 October 2026

Marc Robert Lamont, better known as Caedrel, is a British content creator, streamer, retired professional League of Legends player and sports commentator for Riot Games. He is also known for his time as a professional League of Legends coach, serving as both head coach and assistant coach for Los Ratones from 2024 to 2026, where he also served as the team's founder and co-owner.

Known for holding co-streams of major professional League of Legends regional and international competitions, Caedrel is considered one of the biggest streamers within the game's community, mostly known for his in-depth gameplay analysis and familiarity.

On the livestreaming platform Twitch, Caedrel operates the biggest channel on the League of Legends category and constantly ranks among the top streamers in the English language according to Streams Charts.

Caedrel is also known for his time as a caster in the League of Legends EMEA Championship (LEC) and cast several major international tournaments, including the final of the 2022 League of Legends World Championship. He currently co-streams mainly the LEC and the League of Legends Champions Korea (LCK), as well as all three international competitions. He also co-streams select League of Legends Pro League (LPL) and League Championship Series (LCS) matches.

== Early life ==
Caedrel was born on 19 March 1996. Growing up in Spain, he became fluent in the Spanish language and grew up watching his brother playing World of Warcraft, a massively multiplayer online role-playing game (MMORPG). As a child, Caedrel would play games such as RuneScape and Halo 3.

He started playing League of Legends when his friends' shift to personal computer (PC) games influenced him to download the game on his laptop.

== Professional career ==
Caedrel began his professional career in May 2015, joining xPerience eSports Club as their midlaner until July of the same year. Following a brief stint with now-defunct Team ALTERNATE (then known as ALTERNATE aTTaX), he joined Giants Gaming as their substitute midlaner until the end of the year. In January 2016, Lamont signed with Renegades Banditos in the European Challenger Series. After the disbandment of Renegades' League of Legends roster in May 2016 due to several issues, Caedrel then joined multiple teams for the rest of the year.

=== Joining H2k and promotion to EU LCS (2017–2018) ===
In 2017, Caedrel joined H2k-Gaming as a substitute. He would then return to the team as part of their main roster after a four-month stint with Schalke 04 Esports where they would place second in the EUCS Summer Split. This period was where Caedrel would also earn his first promotion to the European League Championship Series (now League of Legends EMEA Championship) with a 3–0 win over Ninjas in Pyjamas on 25 August 2017. The following year, Caedrel returned to H2k, now as a jungler, and participated in his first EU LCS split, where they would finish with an 8–10 win-loss record, make the quarterfinals where they were defeated by Team Vitality in five games. However, he would spend most of this period as a substitute. In the Summer Split, H2k would finish with a 2–16 record, with two of those wins featuring Caedrel as the starting jungler. In Week One of the Spring 2018 EU LCS split against Team Vitality, Caedrel would make an infamous play, flashing in and canceling his own ultimate on Malzahar.

=== Excel Esports and retirement from professional play (2019–2020) ===
On 2 December 2018, Caedrel joined Excel Esports as their main jungler, where they would finish 9th and 10th in the Spring and Summer Splits, respectively, during the 2019 LEC season. Following another disappointing season in 2020, Caedrel announced his retirement from professional play.

== Post-professional play ==
=== Casting and analyst desk (2020–2023) ===
Whilst still being a player, Caedrel had his first game as a caster in a game between his former team Schalke 04 Esports and Fnatic on 31 January 2020. He also served as a caster and analyst in that year's European Masters, LEC Summer Split Playoffs, and the play-in stage of the 2020 League of Legends World Championship. These casting stints were met with widespread praise, leading to his selection as an on-air talent for the 2021 LEC season.

Caedrel was part of the casting and analyst lineup for three LEC seasons (2021, 2022, and 2023). He also cast the 2021 and 2022 editions of the League of Legends World Championship and the 2021 Mid-Season Invitational. Caedrel cast his final international game during the 2022 edition of Worlds, when he was selected as one of the casters for the tournament's final at the Chase Center in San Francisco, United States alongside Clayton "CaptainFlowers" Raines and Sam "Kobe" Hartman-Kenzler. In the fifth and deciding game between T1 and DRX, Caedrel gained the attention of viewers for his reaction to T1's Lee "Gumayusi" Min-hyeong's steal of the Baron Nashor using the Varus, through an utterance of an expletive and with the phrase, "Guma can he steal it". The phrase has since become synonymous with him and the said game.

Following the 2023 LEC season, Caedrel announced his retirement from casting to focus on streaming full-time, with the season finals between G2 Esports and Fnatic at the Sud de France Arena in Montpellier, France being his last as a caster and analyst.

=== Full-time streaming and other ventures (2023–present) ===
Caedrel started streaming on his Twitch channel in 2020 during his time as a pro-player and caster, but the 2023 League of Legends World Championship in South Korea marked his first tournament as a full-time streamer. It was during this tournament where three videos on his YouTube channel would reach at least one million views as of October 2024. His highest viewed video as of the said time was 2 million for a video of his co-stream highlights of the tournament's semifinal matchup between T1 and JD Gaming. Caedrel was also selected as an onsite co-streamer for the tournament's finals between T1 and Weibo Gaming at the Gocheok Sky Dome in Seoul, serving as one of two co-streamers from the EMEA region alongside Ibai Llanos.

Caedrel joined Fnatic in January 2024 to be one of their content creators and streamers, where he also became their official co-streamer during the 2024 LEC season. He parted ways with the organization on 14 December 2024.

In 2024, Caedrel co-streamed the Spring and Summer Splits of the LCK, LPL, LEC, & LCS, (Note: Caedrel only co-streamed the 2024 LCS Summer Split Playoffs.) the 2024 Mid-Season Invitational and the 2024 League of Legends World Championship. Co-streaming the latter tournament virtually and in-person on three occasions, including the Final between Bilibili Gaming and T1 at The O2 Arena in London, he was both the most-watched co-streamer during the tournament with a peak viewership of 372 thousand, and the most-watched English language stream in the entire World Championship. Caedrel also achieved the highest number of hours watched for a co-streamer in the event at 17.02 million, making up 19.4% of the total hours watched of the entire tournament at 87.5 million, taking into account the official Riot Games stream and other co-streams.

The following year, Caedrel's viewership reached a peak 422,292 according to Streams Charts, which he achieved on his co-stream of the 2025 League of Legends World Championship final between KT Rolster and T1 on 9 November 2025, surpassing his former all-time record of 402,505 set during the 2024 final. 2025 also saw Caedrel co-stream the 2025 Mid-Season Invitational from the Pacific Coliseum in Vancouver and most of the 2025 LCK and LEC seasons, select LPL and LCP matches, and the 2025 LTA North Split 2 playoffs.

For the 2026 competitive season, Caedrel currently co-streams the full LCK and LEC seasons, select LPL and LCS matches, and all international competitions.

==== League Awards ====
On 12 June 2024, Caedrel and his former on-air broadcast colleague Eefje "Sjokz" Depoortere announced the creation of the "League Awards," a League of Legends-oriented awards show aimed at celebrating the game's esports scene and recognizing outstanding players during each competitive season. The first edition of the event took place on 5 December 2024 in Berlin, Germany, with Caedrel and Sjokz serving as hosts. The second edition took place on 28th November 2025 in Munich.

==== Los Ratones ====
Caedrel announced on 15 November 2024 that he would be starting a professional team called "Los Ratones," where he served as head coach in 2025 to the following team members: toplaner Simon "Thebausffs" Hofverberg, jungler Veljko "Velja" Čamdžić, midlaner Tim "Nemesis" Lipovšek, ADC Juš "Crownie" Marušič, and support Carl Martin Erik "Rekkles" Larsson.

In its first competitive season in 2025, the team won the 2025 Winter, Spring, and Summer splits of the Northern League of Legends Championship, and the Winter and Spring splits of EMEA Masters in the same year. The team also won the second season of the NNO Cup in 2024 was also featured in the second and third editions of Red Bull League of Its Own in 2024 and 2025, respectively. In both events, Los Ratones emerged victorious against T1 in showmatches, which featured Lee "Faker" Sang-hyeok.

As a result of its performance during the 2025 season, Los Ratones was invited by the League of Legends EMEA Championship (LEC) to compete in its first split of the 2026 season, also known as "LEC Versus"; the invitation was confirmed on 23 October 2025. This was the team's debut in Tier 1 competition and Caedrel's return to the LEC in a formal capacity following his retirement as a caster in 2023. Caedrel did not serve as head coach but as assistant coach, with Jakob "YamatoCannon" Mebdi replacing him in the former role.

Los Ratones finished the tournament with a 5-6 win-loss slate, narrowly missing playoffs. It would also be the team's final tournament, as Caedrel announced on 12 February 2026 that Los Ratones would disband. It was further revealed that the team planned to fold after their final EMEA Masters split if it did not receive an invitation from the LEC to compete in the 2026 season's first split.

== Channels ==
Caedrel operates three channels on YouTube: the Caedrel main channel which primarily uploads League of Legends esports-related content from his co-streams, "Caedrel Clips" featuring snippets from his live streams on Twitch, and "MoreCaedrel" (formerly CaedrelPlays), which consists of variety videos including gameplay from other games and League of Legends ranked games, either individually or in collaboration with other creators.

== Awards and nominations ==
Year	Ceremony	Category	Result	Ref.
2021	Esports Awards	Analyst of the Year	Won	
2022	Esports Awards	Desk Analyst of the Year	Nominated	
2022	The Streamer Awards	Best League of Legends Streamer	Nominated	
2023	Esports Awards	Colour Caster of the Year	Nominated	
2024	Esports Awards	Community Leader of the Year	Won	
2024	Esports Awards	Personality of the Year	Nominated	
2024	Esports Awards	Streamer of the Year	Nominated	
2024	Esports Awards	Content Creator of the Year	Nominated	
2024	The Streamer Awards	Best MOBA Streamer	Won	
2024	The Streamer Awards	Streamer of the Year	Nominated	
2025	Esports Awards	Personality of the Decade	Nominated	
2025	Esports Awards	Personality of the Year	Nominated	
2025	Esports Awards	Streamer of the Year	Nominated	
2025	Esports Awards	Content Creator of the Year	Nominated	
2025	The Streamer Awards	Best MOBA Streamer	Won	
2025	The Game Awards	Content Creator of the Year	Nominated	
2026	The Streamer Awards	Best MOBA Streamer	Nominated	
2026	Esports Awards	Personality of the Year	Won	
