= Los Ratones =

European League of Legends team (2025–2026)

- Sport: League of Legends
- Founded: 15 November 2024
- Folded: 12 February 2026
- League: League of Legends EMEA Championship (Split 1 2026); EMEA Masters; Northern League of Legends Championship
- Based in: United Kingdom
- Colors: Black and white
- Owner: Marc "Caedrel" Lamont
- Head coach: Jakob "YamatoCannon" Mebdi
- Manager: Kieran Holmes-Darby; Mitsouko Anderson
- Championships: 2 (EMEA Masters); 3 (NLC)
- Partners: Displate, Red Bull

Los Ratones (LR) was a European professional League of Legends team based in the United Kingdom. The club was founded by former player and caster Marc "Caedrel" Lamont. The team was known for being the first British-based organisation to win EMEA Masters, the highest tier of professional competition in the EMEA region outside of the League of Legends EMEA Championship (LEC).

Los Ratones competed in the Northern League of Legends Championship (NLC) in 2025, where they were the first team in league history to win all three splits in the same competitive year. The team made its Tier 1 competition debut in the LEC during the "LEC Versus" event during the 2026 season, as they were invited by virtue of being the best performing team across all EMEA Regional Leagues. Los Ratones disbanded as an organisation on 12 February 2026 following their elimination from LEC Versus.

== History ==
During a livestream on his Twitch channel on 1 June 2024, Caedrel first brought up the idea of competing in the Northern League of Legends Championship (NLC) alongside Tim "Nemesis" Lipovšek and Simon "Thebausffs" Hofverberg, commonly known as Baus. Nemesis was a former LEC player who appeared on two editions of the League of Legends World Championship, while Baus was guest caster and analyst during the 2021 LEC season. Months after the said stream, Caedrel announced on 15 November 2024 that he would be starting a professional team called "Los Ratones", with Nemesis and Baus joining the organisation as its midlaner and toplaner, respectively. They would be joined by jungler Veljko "Velja" Čamdžić, ADC Juš "Crownie" Marušič, and support Carl Martin Erik "Rekkles" Larsson, with Caedrel serving as head coach. Prior to joining the team, Rekkles was part of T1 Esports Academy in the League of Legends Champions Korea (LCK) Challengers League for the 2024 competitive season.

=== Etymology ===
The name, "Los Ratones" first emerged in the "CaedrelPlays" (now "Caedrel2") YouTube channel, one of Caedrel's three channels in which he plays games outside of League of Legends, on 17 September 2023 in a first of a series of videos of him playing "Teamfight Manager," an esports manager game available on digital distribution platform Steam, when he typed "Los Ratones" as the name for his team on the game.

== Scrim streams ==
Los Ratones is known for being the first professional League of Legends team in the modern era to live-stream the majority of their scrims. Scrims, or practice matches between professional teams, are typically private in League of Legends to protect strategies for official games. On scrim days, Los Ratones can be expected to receive tens of thousands of concurrent viewers across Caedrel and the players' streams. The fan reception of LR's scrim streams inspired FlyQuest and Cloud9 of the League Championship Series (LCS) (then known as the League of Legends Championship of The Americas (LTA) North Conference) to also stream their own scrims.

On 9 March 2025, Los Ratones was originally scheduled to have practice matches against GiantX, a team currently competing in the LEC. However, this was cancelled due to a rule by game developer Riot Games that prevented the scrims from being livestreamed. The team, however, streamed practice matches against GAM Esports of the League of Legends Championship Pacific (LCP) in July 2025.

== Events and Competitions ==
=== LEC ===
On 30 March 2025, in an update video published to the team's YouTube channel days after their first EMEA Masters victory, team founder and head coach Marc "Caedrel" Lamont disclosed that one of Los Ratones' goals is to be part of a Tier 1 region in the future. Prior to the video's release, fans have expressed their interest to see Los Ratones compete in the League of Legends EMEA Championship (LEC), the top tier professional League of Legends competition in the EMEA region, which provides a pathway to international competitions (First Stand Tournament, Mid-Season Invitational and the League of Legends World Championship).

Due to the current franchising rules in the LEC that began in 2019, it would be deemed impossible for the team to do so and would need to purchase a slot from an existing club or formulate a partnership with an existing team without losing the team's essence and appeal. Alternatively, Caedrel also brought up the idea of Los Ratones competing in the North American Challengers League (NACL) to contest for a guest spot in the now-defunct League of Legends Championship of The Americas (LTA) North Conference (reverted back to the League Championship Series (LCS) following the discontinuation of the LTA on 28 September 2025.)

Riot Games announced on 23 October 2025 that Los Ratones will be competing in the League of Legends EMEA Championship (LEC) only in the first split of the 2026 competitive season, also known as "LEC Versus," by virtue of being the best performing team across all EMEA Regional Leagues (ERLs) during the 2025 season. They were joined by the 2025 EMEA Masters Summer split champions Karmine Corp Blue – academy team of the team's LEC squad. With the invitation, Los Ratones was eligible to qualify for the 2026 First Stand Tournament in Brazil.

In the tournament, Los Ratones had a 5–6 win-loss slate. After losing their first four games, the team went on a string of four consecutive victories, two of which came against Movistar KOI and G2 Esports. However, LR would narrowly miss the playoffs after their loss to Team Vitality and unfavorable results from other matches that followed during the final day of the group stage.

=== NLC ===
On 2 January 2025, Los Ratones announced that it would be competing in the Northern League of Legends Championship (NLC) for the 2025 competitive season.

In the Winter Split, the team went undefeated in the group stage, 4–0, and also went undefeated in the playoffs with a 4–0 series record, en route to its first domestic championship after scoring a 3–0 sweep against NORD Esports in the finals in Nottingham. Los Ratones would then have an undefeated 4–0 record in the Spring Seeding phase. Despite losing to NORD Esports in the upper bracket semifinals in the bracket stage, the team would have an 14–2 game record in the same phase en route to winning its second consecutive NLC title in Copenhagen, with a 3–0 win over The Ruddy Sack, and a 3–0 win over NORD. In the Summer Split, Los Ratones had another undefeated 4–0 in the seeding phase, and went undefeated in their first three playoff matches. The team won in a 3–0 series against Verdant in the finals in Stockholm, Sweden on 30 August 2025 to become the first team in NLC history to win all three splits in the same year. LR did not return to the NLC for the Winter 2026 split due to their participation in LEC Versus and folded before the Spring split.

=== EMEA Masters ===
Los Ratones qualified for all three EMEA Masters splits in 2025. In the Winter Split, the team was seeded in a four-team double elimination bracket group alongside Karmine Corp Blue, Nightbirds, and E wie einfach Esports, where they would qualify alongside KCB to the quarterfinals. In the playoffs, Los Ratones would secure a 3–2 victory over Papara SuperMassive of Turkey in the quarterfinals, before winning against Team Phantasma of Greece in the semifinals, 3–0, to qualify for its first EMEA Masters Finals. Winning in another 3–0 sweep against Ici Japon Corp of France in the final, Los Ratones secured its first EMEA Masters title, becoming the first organisation based in the United Kingdom to do so.

In the Spring Split, Los Ratones went 2–1 in the group stage, qualifying for the playoffs. The team would beat NORD Esports in the round of 16, 3–0, in a rematch of the NLC Spring Finals, before getting past BoostGate Esports in a 3–2 win in the quarterfinals. The team would go on a 6–0 game record across semifinals (vs. BK ROG Esports) and finals (vs. Barça eSports) to win their second EMEA Masters championship, becoming the first team since Karmine Corp to win the tournament more than once.

The team again qualified for EMEA Masters in the Summer Split, where they started the swiss stage at 3–1, but would lose two consecutive matches against Misa Esports and Galions. A 2–0 win against StormMedia FMS would see them qualify for the playoffs. In the round of 16, Los Ratones would secure a 3–0 sweep against Team Vitality Bee to advance to the quarterfinals, where they would beat Galions in a swiss stage rematch with a 3–1 scoreline. However, the semifinals would see Los Ratones' first elimination series loss in its history, where they were defeated by Karmine Corp Blue in the semifinals, 0–3, ending their EMEA Masters campaign.

=== NNO Cup ===
Los Ratones entered its first tournament as an organisation in November 2024 when they joined the second season of the NNO Cup, a tournament organised by German team No Need Orga. In the tournament, the team went undefeated in the winning bracket with a 12–2 win-loss game record, winning all their best-of-five series en route to its first title. Notably, Caedrel was the team's support player as Rekkles was unable to join the team.

=== Red Bull League of Its Own ===
On 29 November 2024, the team announced via its X (formerly Twitter) account that the second edition of Red Bull League of Its Own would be the live debut of Los Ratones, where they would face T1 in a showmatch at the Accor Arena in Paris, France. In the event, Los Ratones emerged victorious against T1, which featured Lee "Faker" Sang-hyeok and Park "Untara" Ui-jin, who was Ryu "Keria" Min-seok's replacement in the event.

Los Ratones was confirmed on 28 September 2025 as one of the teams participating in the Red Bull League of Its Own's third edition on 29 November at the SAP Garden in Munich, Germany. In the event, the team went on a 1–1 record across two matches, losing to Karmine Corp, which featured members of the Karmine Corp Blue team that won the 2025 EMEA Masters Summer Split, and winning against T1 which had both Faker and its new ADC Kim "Peyz" Su-hwan.

== Roster ==
Los Ratones roster
Players
Coaches

Role	Handle	Name	Nationality
Top	Baus	Simon Hofverberg	Sweden
Jungle	Velja	Veljko Čamdžić	Serbia
Mid	Nemesis	Tim Lipovšek	Slovenia
ADC	Crownie	Juš Marušič	Slovenia
Support	Rekkles	Carl Martin Erik Larsson	Sweden

Head coach

- Jakob "YamatoCannon" Mebdi

Assistant coach(es)

- Marc "Caedrel" Lamont
- Kevin Edward "Shaves" Tolman

Legend:
- (I) Inactive
- (S) Suspended
- Substitute
- (injured) Injury / Illness

Latest roster transaction: 15 November 2024.

== Professional standings ==
=== Season-by-season records ===
Year	Domestic				Ref.
Year	League	Winter	Spring	Summer	
2025	NLC	Winners	Winners	Winners	
2025	EMEA Masters	Winners	Winners	3rd–4th	
2026	LEC	9th	—	—	

=== Tournaments results ===
Date	Tournament	Place	Result	Prize	Ref.
8 December 2024	NNO Cup Season 2	1st	3:1 Final	€10,000	
24 January 2025	NLC 2025 Winter Seeding – Group A	1st	4:0 Group		
2 March 2025	NLC Winter Split 2025	1st	3:0 Final		
23 March 2025	EMEA Masters Winter Split 2025	1st	3:0 Final	€16,000	
11 April 2025	NLC 2025 Spring Seeding – Group A	1st	4:0 Group		
1 June 2025	NLC Spring Split 2025	1st	3:0 Final		
21 June 2025	EMEA Masters Spring Split 2025	1st	3:0 Final		
24 July 2025	NLC 2025 Summer Seeding – Group A	1st	4:0 Group		
30 August 2025	NLC Summer Split 2025	1st	3:0 Final		
20 October 2025	EMEA Masters Summer Split 2025	3rd–4th	0:3 Semifinal		
8 February 2026	LEC Versus 2026	9th	5:6 Group		

== Disbandment ==
Days after their final LEC game, Caedrel announced on 12 February 2026 that Los Ratones would disband. It was also revealed that the team planned to fold after their final EMEA Masters split if it did not receive an invitation from the LEC to compete in the 2026 season's first split. A day before, Simon "Thebausffs" Hofverberg announced that he would return to streaming and would not continue professional play.

This is the end of the Los Ratones project. It's been a good one; it's been a great one. I didn't think we'd get to here when we first started. Did we really expect to play in LEC? Definitely not. Thank you for allowing us to do that. Thank you to everyone who supported us through that journey.

— Marc "Caedrel" Lamont, Founder of Los Ratones

== Legacy ==
Los Ratones is credited for the introduction of streaming practice matches or "scrims", a practice never usually done by professional teams. As the streams continued to become more popular, several Tier 1 leagues took notice. LEC Commissioner Artem Bykov announced on 13 March 2025 that a trial phase until 23 March of the same year would be in place to allow LEC teams to publicly stream their practice matches under particular conditions. Then-LTA Commissioner Mark Zimmerman also made a similar announcement on 21 March 2025 that teams in the league may scrim teams from Tier 2 leagues, so long as the team schedules are not in conflict.

Riot Games' Global Influencer Manager for League of Legends Brandon Ho said of the team, "The impact Los Ratones had on the League community will forever outshine any final standings." Joshua "Jatt" Leesman, one of the commentators for the League Championship Series (LCS), called Los Ratones an "incredible and compelling story", citing similarities with the establishments of Team SoloMid (TSM) and Cloud9 when both teams were formed and competed in the LCS (then known as the NA LCS) in its first few years. LCS caster Isaac "Azael" Cummings-Bentley described the team as "5 guys & a dream enjoying playing together and trying to accomplish something special." Jake "Hysterics" Osypenko, one of the LEC and EMEA Masters casters who worked on Los Ratones matches, said, "To a once in a lifetime journey, thanks for such a wild ride".

Former NLC caster Georgia "Troubleinc" Paras, who cast Los Ratones matches during their stint in the league in 2025, credited the team for helping her find her identity as a caster and a streamer through her casting and co-stream of the team's games.

Thank you for igniting that passion and fire in a lot of people who had given up, including me.

— Georgia "Troubleinc" Paras, Former Northern League of Legends Championship caster

Esports journalist Ilyas Marchoude wrote that Los Ratones' fanbase and popularity is reminiscent of Movistar KOI and Karmine Corp, noting both teams' links with popular influencers in Ibai Llanos and Kamel ‘Kameto’ Kebir and citing Caedrel's growing popularity. Reports of the team's devoted fanbase extended to regional and international League of Legends competitions, with fans sporting the team's merchandise and Los Ratones-related signs in events such as the 2025 Mid-Season Invitational and the 2025 League of Legends World Championship.

As Los Ratones would have qualified for the 2026 EMEA Masters Winter Split via their LEC Versus participation, all remaining players from the roster would compete in the tournament as "Witchcraft". Former LEC, LCS and LTA champion Gabriël "Bwipo" Rau would join the team as their toplaner to replace Baus. Witchcraft failed to qualify for the knockout stage of the split, losing in their group final to G2 NORD and finishing 13th–20th.

=== Viewership ===
Los Ratones' popularity and fanbase also resulted in significant viewership increases for both the Northern League of Legends Championship (NLC) and the League of Legends EMEA Championship (LEC) for the 2025 season and the first split of the 2026 season, respectively. According to Esports Charts, the NLC saw the highest peak viewership in its history during the winter split with 360,545 viewers for the final between Los Ratones and NORD Esports on 14 February 2025, surpassing peak viewership numbers reached by the League of Legends Championship of The Americas (LTA), China's League of Legends Pro League (LPL), and the League of Legends Championship Pacific (LCP) in the same period. In both the NLC's Spring and Summer splits, Los Ratones' matches were among the most viewed in each period.

During the LEC Versus event for the league's first split of 2026, three Los Ratones matches were among the top five most viewed by peak viewership, with their final game against Team Vitality reaching 591,490 peak viewers. Other prominent matches included their wins over G2 Esports (585,243) and SK Gaming (533,127). Outside of the NLC and LEC, Los Ratones drew in 612,000 viewers for its showmatch against T1 during the Red Bull League of Its Own event on 15 December 2024, which was the highest in the team's history.
