= Ultraliga =

Annual video game competition

- Sport: League of Legends
- Founded: 1 October 2018
- Folded: 14 November 2024
- Replaced by: Rift Legends
- Organizing body: Frenzy
- No. of teams: 8 (2024)
- Country: Poland, Lithuania, Latvia, Estonia, Ukraine, Georgia, Israel
- Region: EMEA
- Last champion: Zero Tenacity (Summer 2024)
- Most titles: Rogue Esports Club/AGO Rogue (4)
- Qualification: Champion and Runner-up: EMEA Masters Group Stage
- Level on pyramid: 1st
- Relegation to: Ultraliga 2nd division
- Website: Ultraliga

Ultraliga was the top level of League of Legends esports in Poland, Lithuania, Latvia, Estonia, Ukraine, Georgia and Israel.

== History ==
The league was created in 2018. Originally, the league covered only Poland. In 2022, Ultraliga also covered the countries that have so far competed in the Baltic Masters – Lithuania, Latvia and Estonia. From the 2023 season, Ultraliga also covered Ukraine, Georgia and Israel. There were 2 seasons in Ultraliga per year.

Starting 2021, at the end of each season, teams received Year Points. Every two seasons (once every year), two teams with the fewest points played in the Ultraliga promotion/relegation Tournament to defend their spot in the Ultraliga. If they lost, they were relegated to the second division of the Ultraliga. In 2024, only one team played in promotion/relegation Tournament.

On 14 November 2024, Frenzy announced that they did not renew their license with Riot Games, ending Ultraliga. Ultraliga would be replaced by Rift Legends, run by GAMERS_X.

Ultraliga was an ERL - an EMEA Regional League. Therefore, the best teams in the league competed in the EMEA Masters.

== List of Ultraliga finals ==
List of Ultraliga finals
Season	Date	Winners	Score	Runners-up					
Season	Date	Winners	Score	Runners-up	Season 0	23 December 2018	Illuminar Gaming	3-2	Pompa Team
Season 1	27 March 2019	Rogue Esports Club	3-2	devils.one					
Season 2	28 August 2019	devils.one	3-2	Rogue Esports Club					
Season 3	1 April 2020	AGO ROGUE	3-1	K1CK Neosurf					
Season 4	12 August 2020	K1CK Neosurf	3-1	AGO ROGUE					
Season 5	24 March 2021	AGO ROGUE	3-2	K1CK					
Season 6	11 August 2021	PDW	3-2	Illuminar Gaming					
Season 7	30 March 2022	AGO ROGUE	3-0	Team ESCA Gaming					
Season 8	17 August 2022	Zero Tenacity	3-0	AGO ROGUE					
Season 9	31 March 2023	Zero Tenacity	3-1	Orbit Anonymo					
Season 10	12 August 2023	Orbit Anonymo	3-0	AliorBank Team					
Spring 2024	23 March 2024	Zero Tenacity	3-0	Orbit Anonymo					
Summer 2024	8 August 2024	Zero Tenacity	3-0	Back2TheGame					
