= John Pleasants =

American entrepreneur and business executive (born 1965)

John F. Pleasants
- Pleasants in 2015
- Born: August 19, 1965 (age 61); Wilmington, Delaware, United States
- Education: Yale University, Harvard Business School
- Occupations: Entrepreneur and business executive
- Known for: Led a number of digital media and technology companies

John Pleasants is an American technology and media executive, entrepreneur, investor, and board director. Over the course of his career, he has held leading roles across digital media, interactive entertainment, mobile technology, e-commerce, and consumer products, including at The Walt Disney Company, IAC, Ticketmaster, Electronic Arts and Samsung Electronics.

Pleasants served as CEO of Ticketmaster from 1999 to 2005, during a period of rapid growth in online ticketing and digital commerce. He later served as co-president of Disney Interactive, helping lead the division’s expansion into mobile gaming and digital distribution.

He has served on the boards of several public and private technology and media companies, including Expedia Group, Ticketmaster, Peloton, and Leaf Group.

== Early life and education ==
John Pleasants was born on August 19, 1965, in Wilmington, Delaware. He graduated from St. Paul's School in Concord, New Hampshire in 1983. After receiving his bachelor's degree at Yale University in 1987, Pleasants obtained an M.B.A. from Harvard Business School in 1993.

== Career ==
=== Early career and Ticketmaster / IAC ===
Pleasants began his career in consumer products in 1988 at Hygiene Industries and subsequently PepsiCo / Frito-Lay before moving into digital media during the early growth of the commercial internet.

He joined CitySearch in 1996, which later merged with Ticketmaster, where he held several senior executive roles including president and CEO from 1999-2005. During his tenure, Ticketmaster expanded its online ticketing and digital commerce operations as the live entertainment industry shifted from phone and retail distribution to internet-based ticketing.

Pleasants also served as President of Information Services for IAC during this time. He led a number of expansive acquisitions and integrations including Match.com, Active Network, and Evite.

=== Digital health, media and gaming ===
In 2005 Pleasants assumed the role of CEO of Revolution Health. In 2008, he joined Electronic Arts, where he served as president of publishing and COO. His work focused on global operations, digital distribution, online services, and mobile gaming during a broader industry transition from packaged software and console-centric gaming to digitally distributed and live-service entertainment models.

Pleasants then became CEO of Playdom, a social gaming company acquired by The Walt Disney Company for $563 million in 2010. Following the acquisition, Pleasants became co-president of Disney Interactive, which he helped bring from significant losses to material profits with titles like Disney Infinity.

In 2013, Pleasants was recruited by Samsung Electronics as executive vice president of Media Solutions, where he focused on mobile software ecosystems, digital media partnerships, connected services, and consumer engagement platforms tied to Samsung's Galaxy mobile business.

=== Connected home technology ===
In 2016, Pleasants joined Brava Home as co-founder and CEO. Brava developed an intelligent countertop oven that cooks with light, which first launched in 2018. Brava was then acquired by The Middleby Corporation, a leading foodservice equipment company, in November of 2019. In 2023, Pleasants co-founded HomeBoost, an AI-powered home energy and management platform.

=== Board and advisory service ===
Pleasants continues to serve on the boards of AI, technology, media, and consumer companies. His board service has included roles with Expedia Group, Leaf Group, Ticketmaster, Peloton, Displate, Amber, HomeBoost, and other AI-powered technology companies.

=== Civic and nonprofit involvement ===
Pleasants is involved in philanthropic, civic, education, and humanitarian initiatives, including serving as founding member and regional board member of Leadership Now Project.

== Recognition ==
Honor	Company	Year(s)
Sports Business Journal's Forty Under Forty Award	Ticketmaster	2002, 2003
Business Insider's The Silicon Valley 100 Award	Playdom	2010
TechCrunch's The TechFellow Awards Nominee	Playdom	2010
NEA's Award for Outstanding Leadership	Disney	2011

== Personal life ==
Pleasants is married with three children and lives in Silicon Valley, California.
