= Thebausffs =

Swedish Twitch streamer and professional League of Legends player

Personal information
- Name: Simon Hofverberg
- Nickname(s): Baus, Thebaus, the Messi of League of Legends, Babus
- Born: 3 October 1999 (age 27); Sweden
- Nationality: Swedish

Career information
- Games: League of Legends
- Playing career: 2024–present
- Role: Top

Team history
- 2024–2026: Los Ratones

Career highlights and awards
- 2x EMEA Masters champion; 3x NLC champion; NLC Rookie of the Split

Twitch information
- Channel: thebausffs
- Years active: 2015–present
- Genres: Gaming; League of Legends
- Followers: 1.6 million

YouTube information
- Channel: @Thebausffs
- Subscribers: 1.11M subscribers
- Views: 711,766,070 views
- Last updated: 3 November 2026

Simon "Baus" Hofverberg, better known as Thebausffs, is a Swedish Twitch streamer and former professional player, who most recently played for Los Ratones. He is known for his unique playstyle that nets him a low KDA and his unique catchphrases such as "wpgg", "good death", and "solo bolo".

== Career ==
=== Twitch streaming ===
Thebausffs is a full-time live-streamer on Twitch where he plays League of Legends. In 2024 he had an average per-stream viewership of 14,251 viewers with a peak viewership of 105,008 viewers. As of February 2025, he is the 52nd most watched channel on Twitch with 2.63 million viewer hours per month.

=== Early pro career ===
Baus had previously been signed as a substitute for G2 Esports for the 2019 season and as a substitute for BIG for the 2020 season.

=== Public image ===
Hofverberg adopted the online alias "Babus" after a viewer on his Twitch livestream posed a benign question with the misspelling of his name "Babus" instead of "Baus". Hofverberg subsequently created a League of Legends account with the name "Babus" and was met with positive reception from the world.

=== Los Ratones ===
Marc "Caedrel" Lamont announced on 15 November 2024 that he would be starting a professional team called Los Ratones, serving as head coach to the following team members: toplaner Simon "Thebausffs" Hofverberg, jungler Veljko "Velja" Čamdžić, midlaner Tim "Nemesis" Lipovšek, ADC Juš "Crownie" Marušič, and support Martin "Rekkles" Larsson. The team has won the second season of the NNO Cup in 2024, the 2025 Winter Split of the Northern League of Legends Championship, and the EMEA Masters Winter Split in the same year. The team was also featured in the second edition of Red Bull League of Its Own at the Accor Arena in Paris, France. In the event, Los Ratones emerged victorious against 2024 World Champions T1 in a showmatch, which featured Lee "Faker" Sang-hyeok.

On 12 February 2026, Caedrel announced Los Ratones will be disbanding following their LEC 2026 exit.
