= Ultraliga Season 6 =

2021 video game competition

- League: Ultraliga
- Sport: League of Legends
- Duration: 8 June 2021 - 11 August 2021
- Matches: 63
- Teams: 8
- TV partner: Polsat
- League champions: PDW
- Runners-up: Illuminar Gaming

Seasons
- Season 5 Season 7

Ultraliga Season 6 was the 7th edition of the Ultraliga. AGO ROGUE was the defending champion. It was the last season Ultraliga covered only Poland and the last one with 8 teams. The competition was won by PDW as they won their 1st title.

== Regular season ==
8 June 2021 – 21 July 2021

| Pos | Team | W | L | Pts | Qualification or relegation |
|---|---|---|---|---|---|
| 1 | AGO ROGUE | 12 | 2 | 12 | Upper Bracket Final |
| 2 | Team ESCA Gaming | 11 | 3 | 11 | Upper Bracket Round 1 |
| 3 | PDW (Note: 7more7 Pompa Team rebranded to PDW) | 8 | 6 | 8 (Note: Head to head: PDW 2–0 K1CK) | Upper Bracket Round 1 |
| 4 | K1CK | 8 | 6 | 8 | Lower Bracket Round 1 |
| 5 | Illuminar Gaming | 7 | 7 | 7 | Lower Bracket Round 1 |
| 6 | Komil&Friends | 4 | 10 | 4 (Note: Head to head: Komil&Friends 1-1 Gentlemen's Gaming, Tiebreaker: Komil&Friends 1-0 Gentlemen's Gaming) | |
| 7 | Gentlemen's Gaming | 4 | 10 | 4 | |
| 8 | devils.one | 2 | 12 | 2 | |

== Playoffs ==
27 July 2021 – 11 August 2021

=== Upper Bracket and Final ===
Upper Bracket Round 1
2 | Team ESCA Gaming | 1
3 | PDW | 3

Upper Bracket Final
1 | AGO ROGUE | 0
3 | PDW | 3

Final
3 | PDW | 3
5 | Illuminar Gaming | 2

=== Lower Bracket ===
Lower Bracket Round 1
4 | K1CK | 2
5 | Illuminar Gaming | 3

Lower Bracket Round 2
5 | Illuminar Gaming | 3
2 | Team ESCA Gaming | 1

Lower Bracket Final
5 | Illuminar Gaming | 3
1 | AGO ROGUE | 0

- PDW and Illuminar Gaming qualified for European Masters 2021 Summer Group Stage
- AGO ROGUE qualified for European Masters 2021 Summer Play In Stage
