= Ultraliga Season 7 =

2022 video game competition

- League: Ultraliga
- Sport: League of Legends
- Duration: 11 January 2022 - 30 March 2022
- Matches: 96
- Teams: 10
- TV partner: Polsat
- League champions: AGO ROGUE
- Runners-up: Team ESCA Gaming

Seasons
- Season 6 Season 8

Ultraliga Season 7 was the 8th edition of the Ultraliga. PDW sold their spot and therefore were not able to defend the title. It was the first season Ultraliga covered more than just Poland, as the Baltic States were added to the league. The league was therefore expanded from 8 to 10 teams and Expansion Tournament was held after season 6 to determine 2 new teams, Goskilla and Iron Wolves qualified for Season 7 through it. The competition was won by AGO ROGUE as they won their 4th Ultraliga title.

== Promotion/Relegation ==
18 August 2021

Qualification Match
UL	Komil&Friends	3
UL2	EAS Team ESCA Gaming	1
UL	Gentlemen's Gaming	3
UL2	piratesports	0

- Komil&Friends defended their spot in Ultraliga
- Gentlemen's Gaming defended their spot in Ultraliga

== Expansion Tournament ==
10 October 2021 – 18 October 2021

=== Upper Bracket ===
Upper Bracket Semifinals
Iron Wolves	3
Estovian Vipers	0
GOEXANIMO	0
Goskilla	3

Qualification Match
Iron Wolves	3
Goskilla	0

=== Lower Bracket ===
Lower Bracket Round 1
Estovian Vipers	1
Method2Madness	3
GOEXANIMO	W
*Bye	FF

Lower Bracket Round 2
Method2Madness	1
GOEXANIMO	3

Qualification Match
GOEXANIMO	1
Goskilla	3

- Iron Wolves and Goskilla qualified to Ultraliga

== Regular season ==
11 January 2022 – 9 March 2022

Pos	Team	W	L	Pts	Qualification or relegation
1	AGO ROGUE	15	3	15	Upper Bracket Final
2	Iron Wolves	13	5	13	Upper Bracket Final
3	Team ESCA Gaming	12	6	12	Lower Bracket Round 1
4	Zero Tenacity (Note: Zero Tenacity acquired the spot of PDW)	10	8	10	Lower Bracket Round 1
5	Komil&Friends	9	9	9 (Note: Head to head: Komil&Friends 2–0 Forsaken)	Lower Bracket Round 1
6	Forsaken (Note: Forsaken acquired the spot of K1CK)	9	9	9	Lower Bracket Round 1
7	Gentlemen's Gaming	8	10	8	
8	Goskilla	6	12	6 (Note: Head to head: Goskilla 1–1 Illuminar Gaming)	
9	Illuminar Gaming	6	12	6	
10	devils.one	2	16	2	

== Playoffs ==
15 March 2022 – 30 March 2022

=== Upper Bracket and Final ===
Upper Bracket Final
1	AGO ROGUE	3
2	Iron Wolves	0

Final
1	AGO ROGUE	3
3	Team ESCA Gaming	0

=== Lower Bracket ===
Lower Bracket Round 1
3	Team ESCA Gaming	3
6	Forsaken	1
4	Zero Tenacity	3
5	Komil&Friends	1

Lower Bracket Round 2
3	Team ESCA Gaming	3
4	Zero Tenacity	0

Lower Bracket Final
3	Team ESCA Gaming	3
2	Iron Wolves	2

- AGO ROGUE and Team ESCA Gaming qualified for European Masters 2022 Spring Group Stage
- Iron Wolves and Zero Tenacity qualified for European Masters 2022 Spring Play In Stage
