= Revolution Health Group =

Former US healthcare company

- Type: Private
- Industry: Healthcare
- Founded: July 2005
- Headquarters: Washington DC, United States
- Key people: Steve Case, Chairman/CEO
- Website: www.revolutionhealth.com

Revolution Health Group was a United States–based corporation founded in July 2005 by Steve Case. It was one of three companies in the Revolution LLC group of companies.

The Revolution Health board of directors was chaired by Steve Case, and its members included former Secretary of State Colin Powell; Frank Raines, Jim Barksdale, Steve Wiggins, Carly Fiorina, Miles Gilburne, Jeff Zients, John Delaney, and David Golden; and Revolution Health CEO John Pleasants, among others.

By October 2006, it had acquired Simo Software, Wondir, Extend Benefits, and ConnectYourCare, in its efforts to transform US healthcare.

On October 25, 2007, the company dismissed 60 employees, or a quarter of its workforce, as part of a restructuring.

On October 3, 2008, Revolution Health announced that it would merge with Waterfront Media in a deal valued at $300 million.
