= 2023 LEC season =

Electronic sports season

- League: LEC
- Sport: League of Legends
- Duration: 21 Jan – 26 Feb (Winter); 11 Mar – 23 Apr (Spring); 17 Jun – 30 Jul (Summer); 19 Aug – 10 Sep (Season Finals)
- Number of teams: 10

Winter
- Champions: G2 Esports
- Runners-up: MAD Lions

Spring
- Champions: MAD Lions
- Runners-up: Team BDS

Summer
- Champions: G2 Esports
- Runners-up: Excel Esports

Season Finals
- Champions: G2 Esports
- Runners-up: Fnatic

LEC seasons
- ← 2022 2024 →

The 2023 LEC season is the 11th season of the League of Legends EMEA Championship (LEC), a professional esports league for the MOBA PC game League of Legends, and the first under new branding. The LEC rebranded from the "European Championship" to the "EMEA Championship" to broaden player eligibility. Two team changes occurred for the 2023 season, with Misfits Gaming selling their LEC franchise slot to Team Heretics and Rogue rebranding to KOI. The league also saw a major format change, expanding from two splits to three, and introduced a season final playoff. The schedule also underwent adjustments, with Superweeks every week, extending into Monday.

== League changes ==
=== Branding and regions ===
The LEC rebranded from the League of Legends European Championship to the League of Legends EMEA Championship, opening eligibility for players with residency status in Europe, the Commonwealth of Independent States (CIS), Russia, Turkey, and the Middle East/North Africa to participate in the league without transfer restrictions. The League of Legends Continental League (for CIS and Russia) remained suspended but allowed CIS-based league to be integrated into the expanded LEC in the future.

=== Format ===
The LEC underwent a significant revamp in its format for the year 2023. The new format featured three splits with three champions throughout the year. Each split consisted of three weeks of a round-robin regular season, followed by a group stage with the top eight teams from the regular season engaging in a double-elimination bracket over two weeks. The top four teams emerging from this stage proceeded to the playoffs, where they competed in a best-of-five, double-elimination format for the trophy. The three seasonal champions automatically qualified for the Season Finals, where overall seeding was determined by Championship Points. In the Season Finals, the three LEC champions met the top Championship Points candidates in a final four-week, best-of-five double-elimination bracket to decide the yearly LEC Champion.

Unlike the previous structure where games were played primarily on Saturdays and Sundays with occasional Friday "Superweeks," the new schedule included Superweeks every week. Instead of concluding on Sunday, each week extended into Monday. This schedule adjustment was part of a broader transformation in the European League of Legends ecosystem. The aim was to increase the significance of regular-season games, as they historically tended to matter less, especially in the Spring splits.

=== Teams ===
The 2023 season saw two team changes coming into the season. In July 2022, Misfits Gaming sold their LEC franchise slot to Team Heretics, effective at the beginning of the 2023 LEC season. Additionally, following the merger between Rougue and KOI in October 2022, Rogue rebranded to KOI.

== Winter ==
=== Regular season ===
| Pos | Team | Pld | W | L | PCT | Qualification |
|---|---|---|---|---|---|---|
| 1 | Team Vitality | 9 | 7 | 2 | .778 | Advance to Group stage |
| 2 | MAD Lions | 9 | 7 | 2 | .778 | Advance to Group stage |
| 3 | SK Gaming | 9 | 6 | 3 | .667 | Advance to Group stage |
| 4 | G2 Esports | 9 | 6 | 3 | .667 | Advance to Group stage |
| 5 | Team BDS | 9 | 5 | 4 | .556 | Advance to Group stage |
| 6 | Team Heretics | 9 | 4 | 5 | .444 | Advance to Group stage |
| 7 | KOI | 9 | 4 | 5 | .444 | Advance to Group stage |
| 8 | Astralis | 9 | 3 | 6 | .333 | Advance to Group stage |
| 9 | Fnatic | 9 | 2 | 7 | .222 | |
| 10 | Excel Esports | 9 | 1 | 8 | .111 | |

Source: LoL Esports

=== Groups ===
Group A

Upper round 1
1 | Team Vitality | 2
6 | Team Heretics | 1
3 | SK Gaming | 0
7 | KOI | 2
Lower round 1
6 | Team Heretics | 0
3 | SK Gaming | 2

Upper round 2
1 | Team Vitality | 0
7 | KOI | 2
Lower round 2
1 | Team Vitality | 0
3 | SK Gaming | 2

Group B

Upper round 1
2 | MAD Lions | 2
8 | Astralis | 1
4 | G2 Esports | 2
5 | Team BDS | 1
Lower round 1
8 | Astralis | 2
5 | Team BDS | 1

Upper round 2
2 | MAD Lions | 0
4 | G2 Esports | 2
Lower round 2
2 | MAD Lions | 2
8 | Astralis | 0

=== Playoffs ===
Round 1
A1 | KOI | 1
B1 | G2 Esports | 3
A2 | SK Gaming | 2
B2 | MAD Lions | 3

Round 2
KOI | 1
MAD Lions | 3

Final
G2 Esports | 3
MAD Lions | 0

==== Final standings ====
| Pos | Team | Qualification |
|---|---|---|
| 1 | G2 Esports | MSI 2023 Play-In stage and Season Finals |
| 2 | MAD Lions | |
| 3 | KOI | |
| 4 | SK Gaming | |

== Spring ==
=== Regular season ===
| Pos | Team | Pld | W | L | PCT | Qualification |
|---|---|---|---|---|---|---|
| 1 | Team BDS | 9 | 7 | 2 | .778 | Advance to Group stage |
| 2 | Astralis | 9 | 6 | 3 | .667 | Advance to Group stage |
| 3 | G2 Esports | 9 | 6 | 3 | .667 | Advance to Group stage |
| 4 | Team Vitality | 9 | 6 | 3 | .667 | Advance to Group stage |
| 5 | SK Gaming | 9 | 4 | 5 | .444 | Advance to Group stage |
| 6 | Fnatic | 9 | 4 | 5 | .444 | Advance to Group stage |
| 7 | KOI | 9 | 4 | 5 | .444 | Advance to Group stage |
| 8 | MAD Lions | 9 | 3 | 6 | .333 | Advance to Group stage |
| 9 | Team Heretics | 9 | 3 | 6 | .333 | |
| 10 | Excel Esports | 9 | 2 | 7 | .222 | |

Source: LoL Esports

=== Groups ===
Group A

Upper round 1
2 | Astralis | 2
6 | Fnatic | 1
4 | Team Vitality | 2
8 | MAD Lions | 0
Lower round 1
6 | Fnatic | 1
8 | MAD Lions | 2

Upper round 2
2 | Astralis | 0
4 | Team Vitality | 2
Lower round 2
2 | Astralis | 0
8 | MAD Lions | 2

Group B

Upper round 1
1 | Team BDS | 2
5 | SK Gaming | 0
3 | G2 Esports | 1
7 | KOI | 2
Lower round 1
5 | SK Gaming | 0
3 | G2 Esports | 2

Upper round 2
1 | Team BDS | 2
7 | KOI | 0
Lower round 2
7 | KOI | 1
3 | G2 Esports | 2

=== Playoffs ===
Round 1
A1 | Team Vitality | 0
B1 | Team BDS | 3
A2 | MAD Lions | 3
B2 | G2 Esports | 2

Round 2
Team Vitality | 1
MAD Lions | 3

Final
Team BDS | 2
MAD Lions | 3

==== Final standings ====
| Pos | Team | Qualification |
|---|---|---|
| 1 | MAD Lions | MSI 2023 Play-In stage and Season Finals |
| 2 | Team BDS | |
| 3 | Team Vitality | |
| 4 | G2 Esports | |

== Summer ==
=== Regular season ===
| Pos | Team | Pld | W | L | PCT | Qualification |
|---|---|---|---|---|---|---|
| 1 | G2 Esports | 9 | 8 | 1 | .889 | Advance to Group stage |
| 2 | Fnatic | 9 | 7 | 2 | .778 | Advance to Group stage |
| 3 | Excel Esports | 9 | 5 | 4 | .556 | Advance to Group stage |
| 4 | Team Heretics | 9 | 5 | 4 | .556 | Advance to Group stage |
| 5 | Team BDS | 9 | 4 | 5 | .444 | Advance to Group stage |
| 6 | SK Gaming | 9 | 4 | 5 | .444 | Advance to Group stage |
| 7 | MAD Lions | 9 | 4 | 5 | .444 | Advance to Group stage |
| 8 | KOI | 9 | 4 | 5 | .444 | Advance to Group stage |
| 9 | Astralis | 9 | 3 | 6 | .333 | |
| 10 | Team Vitality | 9 | 1 | 8 | .111 | |

Source: LoL Esports

=== Groups ===
Group A

Upper round 1
1 | G2 Esports | 2
8 | KOI | 0
4 | Team Heretics | 1
5 | Team BDS | 2
Lower round 1
8 | KOI | 0
4 | Team Heretics | 2

Upper round 2
1 | G2 Esports | 2
5 | Team BDS | 0
Lower round 2
5 | Team BDS | 0
4 | Team Heretics | 2

Group B

Upper round 1
2 | Fnatic | 0
6 | SK Gaming | 2
3 | Excel Esports | 2
7 | MAD Lions | 0
Lower round 1
2 | Fnatic | 2
7 | MAD Lions | 0

Upper round 2
6 | SK Gaming | 1
3 | Excel Esports | 2
Lower round 2
6 | SK Gaming | 0
2 | Fnatic | 2

=== Playoffs ===
Round 1
A1 | G2 Esports | 3
B1 | Excel Esports | 2
A2 | Team Heretics | 1
B2 | Fnatic | 3

Round 2
Excel Esports | 3
Fnatic | 1

Final
G2 Esports | 3
Excel Esports | 0

==== Final standings ====
| Pos | Team | Qualification |
|---|---|---|
| 1 | G2 Esports | Season Finals |
| 2 | Excel Esports | |
| 3 | Fnatic | |
| 4 | Team Heretics | |

== Season Finals ==
=== Qualification ===
A total of six teams qualified for the Season Finals. The winner of each split is automatically qualified, while the remaining teams are determined based on Championship Points. Teams are awarded Championship Points at the end of each split based on their performance, and seeding in the Season Finals is determined strictly by Championship Points.

| Pos | Team | Win | Spr | Sum | Total | Qualification |
|---|---|---|---|---|---|---|
| 1 | G2 Esports (Note: Automatically qualified as the winner of the Winter and Summer Splits.) | 120 | 60 | 180 | 360 | Advance to upper bracket |
| 2 | MAD Lions (Note: Automatically qualified as the winner of the Spring Split.) | 100 | 120 | 45 | 265 | Advance to upper bracket |
| 3 | Team BDS | 30 | 100 | 75 | 205 | Advance to upper bracket |
| 4 | Excel Esports | 5 | 5 | 150 | 160 | Advance to upper bracket |
| 5 | Fnatic | 10 | 20 | 120 | 150 | Advance to lower bracket |
| 6 | SK Gaming | 60 | 30 | 60 | 150 | Advance to lower bracket |
| 7 | KOI | 80 | 40 | 30 | 150 | |
| 8 | Team Vitality | 50 | 80 | 7 | 137 | |
| 9 | Team Heretics | 20 | 10 | 90 | 120 | |
| 10 | Astralis | 40 | 50 | 15 | 105 | |

Source: LoL Esports

=== Bracket ===
Upper semifinals | Upper final | Final
1 | G2 Esports | 3
3 | Team BDS | 1
1 | G2 Esports | 3
2 | MAD Lions | 1
2 | MAD Lions | 3
4 | Excel Esports | 0
1 | G2 Esports | 3
Lower quarterfinals | Lower semifinals | Lower final | 5 | Fnatic | 1
4 | Excel Esports | 2
2 | MAD Lions | 2
5 | Fnatic | 3
5 | Fnatic | 3 | 5 | Fnatic | 3
3 | Team BDS | 2
3 | Team BDS | 3
6 | SK Gaming | 0

==== Final standings ====
| Pos | Team | Qualification |
|---|---|---|
| 1 | G2 Esports | Worlds 2023 Swiss Stage |
| 2 | Fnatic | Worlds 2023 Swiss Stage |
| 3 | MAD Lions | Worlds 2023 Swiss Stage |
| 4 | Team BDS | Worlds Qualifying Series 2023 |
| 5 | Excel Esports | |
| 6 | SK Gaming | |

== Awards ==
Winter

- 1st Team All-Pro:
  - T Photon, Team Vitality
  - J Elyoya, MAD Lions
  - M Caps, G2 Esports
  - B Hans Sama, G2 Esports
  - S Mikyx, G2 Esports
- 2nd Team All-Pro:
  - T BrokenBlade, G2 Esports
  - J Yike, G2 Esports
  - M Nisqy, MAD Lions
  - B Exakick, SK Gaming
  - S Hylissang, MAD Lions
- 3rd Team All-Pro:
  - T Chasy, MAD Lions
  - J Markoon, SK Gaming
  - M Larssen, KOI
  - B Comp, KOI
  - S Trymbi, KOI

Spring

- 1st Team All-Pro:
  - T Chasy, MAD Lions
  - J Elyoya, MAD Lions
  - M Nisqy, MAD Lions
  - B Crownie, Team BDS
  - S Hylissang, MAD Lions
- 2nd Team All-Pro:
  - T Adam, Team BDS
  - J Sheo, Team BDS
  - M Caps, G2 Esports
  - B Carzzy, MAD Lions
  - S Mikyx, G2 Esports
- 3rd Team All-Pro:
  - T Photon, Team Vitality
  - J Yike, G2 Esports
  - M nuc, Team BDS
  - B Hans Sama, G2 Esports
  - S Labrov, Team BDS

Summer

- 1st Team All-Pro:
  - T Photon, Team Vitality
  - J Elyoya, MAD Lions
  - M Caps, G2 Esports
  - B Hans Sama, G2 Esports
  - S Mikyx, G2 Esports
- 2nd Team All-Pro:
  - T BrokenBlade, G2 Esports
  - J Yike, G2 Esports
  - M Nisqy, MAD Lions
  - B Exakick, SK Gaming
  - S Hylissang, MAD Lions
- 3rd Team All-Pro:
  - T Chasy, MAD Lions
  - J Markoon, SK Gaming
  - M Larssen, KOI
  - B Comp, KOI
  - S Trymbi, KOI

Season

- Most Valuable Player of the Year: Mikyx, G2 Esports
- Rookie of the Year: Yike, G2 Esports
- Coaching Staff of the Year: G2 Esports
