= Inzone =

Gaming-focused electronics brand of Sony

Inzone is a brand of Sony Electronics used for gaming-focused monitors and headphones products.

It was announced on June 28, 2022 with a lineup of two computer monitors and three headphones intended for PC gaming. The brand name is intended to reflect the concept of being "in the zone".

== Product range ==
=== Monitors ===
As of June 2022 there are two Inzone monitors, both of which diagonally measure 27 inches [CONVERT] large. The M3 is the low-end model. The M9 is the high-end model.

=== Headphones ===
As of June 2022, Sony offers three Inzone headphone models: the H3, the H7, and the H9.
