= Excel Esports =

British esports organisation

- Short name: EXCEL, XL
- Divisions: League of Legends; Fortnite Battle Royale; Valorant
- Founded: December 2014
- Based in: London, United Kingdom
- CEO: Tim Reichert
- Partners: JD Sports, EE Limited, HSBC Bank, Sony Inzone, PCSPECIALIST.
- Motto: "The Power of Better"
- Website: xl.gg

Excel Esports (previously stylized as exceL Esports) was a British esports organisation. Its main League of Legends division was one of ten teams competing in the League of Legends EMEA Championship (LEC), the top level of professional League of Legends in Europe, the Middle East and Africa.

On 14 December 2023, Excel Esports and Giants Gaming announced a merger, forming GIANTX.

== League of Legends ==
=== History ===
Logo of Excel Esports from 2019 to 2020

==== 2018 ====
Riot Games announced on 20 November 2018 that Excel Esports would be one of ten franchise partners participating in the newly rebranded League of Legends European Championship (LEC). On 3 January 2019, Excel Esports announced that it would house a training facility in Twickenham Stadium.

==== 2019 ====
For the 2019 LEC Spring Split, Excel signed top laner Ki "Expect" Dae-han, jungler Marc "Caedrel" Lamont, mid laner Fabian "Exile" Schubert, bot laner Jesper "Jeskla" Stromberg, and support Raymond "kaSing" Tsang. In addition to the team's main roster, five other players were also signed as substitutes who would alternate games with players on the main roster. However, the only substitutes who played on-stage in the LEC were mid laner Joran "Special" Scheffer and support Patryk "Mystiques" Piórkowski.

On 28 May 2019, Son "Mickey" Young-min officially joined Excel as starting mid laner. However, he did not play until the second week of the 2019 LEC Summer Split due to visa issues. On 20 June 2019, it was announced that Jeskla and Mystiques would replace Hjarnan and kaSing in the bot lane, and that the latter two would play for Excel UK.

==== 2022 ====
In November 2022, it was announced Excel had acquired the Stuttgart-based esports e-learning platform, Hitcap.

== Valorant ==
=== History ===
Excel Esports announced on 8 March 2021 that they would be entering the competitive Valorant scene with their signing of Ignition Series Champion David "Davidp" Prins, who would be the team's captain.

=== Game Changers ===
In 2022, EE in partnership with EXCEL ESPORTS entered the VALORANT Champions Tour: Game Changers EMEA, a women-only esports team.

== World of Warcraft ==
=== History ===
In August 2018, Excel Esports acquired the WoW roster of Kjell's Angels, which consisted of Rory "Cirra" Singer, Rasmus "Divinefield" Andersen, Hakon "Dorullkjell" Walberg, Lari "Ashine" Strandberg and Kristoffer "Herudra" Jensen. The team participated in the Mythic Dungeon Invitational under the name Excel's Angels.
