= Displate =

Polish poster company

- Type: Private
- Industry: Posters
- Founded: 2013
- Founders: Karol Banaszkiewicz; Jacek Świgost; Edward Ruszczyc
- Headquarters: Warsaw, Poland (int. HQ); Louisville, Kentucky (U.S. HQ)
- Key people: Nicholas Holdcraft (CEO)
- Number of employees: 400+ (2023)
- Website: displate.com

Displate is a Polish metal poster manufacturing company. Founded in 2013, its posters are made of steel and feature many characters and scenes from popular culture, including licensed posters from Star Wars or Marvel, and art made by hired artists. As of 2020, there are over 1.5 million unique designs, which are shipped worldwide.

== History ==
Displate was founded in 2013 by Karol Banaszkiewicz, Jacek Świgost, and Edward Ruszczyc. They wanted to create a new approach to printing and hanging wall art. The product was not an instant hit, and the trio had to print their plates in a small tin shed when they first started. However, they raised two million euros from Credo Ventures to expand their business. Displates began to rise in popularity in 2017, when they signed a licensing agreement with The Walt Disney Company, allowing them to use elements from the Star Wars and Marvel Comics franchises. Mid Europa Partners bought a majority stake in the company in 2020.

== Operations ==
Displate operates an online marketplace that allows independent artists to upload and sell their artwork as metal posters. The company manufactures posters using an on-demand production model.

Displate has its headquarters in Louisville, Kentucky, and Warsaw, Poland. Prior to having its U.S. headquarters in Seattle, Displate had it in Seattle, Washington, and Austin, Texas.

== Products ==
Displates come with magnets, which are adhesive and stick to the wall easily. The steel posters, which may be produced with a matte or gloss finish, are manufactured in two factories in Łódź and Louisville. Displate allows artists to sell their works on their products and has collaborated with over 40,000 of them to do so. It also runs limited prints with enhanced versions of the posters with embellishments and varnishes, which sometimes become popular with collectors. In 2023, they introduced LUMINO, which contained small OLED lights that gave the Displate a glowing appearance. Textra posters, with textured surfaces, were first sold in 2024. In September 2025, Displate launched Custom Displates, allowing users to create metal posters from their own images.
