= EMEA Masters =

League of Legends tournament

- Sport: League of Legends
- Founded: 2018
- Organizing body: Riot Games
- No. of teams: 43 from 13 leagues
- Region: EMEA
- Most recent champion: Galions (2026 Summer)
- Most titles: Karmine Corp Blue (5 titles)

EMEA Masters (formerly known as the European Masters) is a League of Legends tournament organized three a year by Riot Games. The tournament is the conclusion of each split of the EMEA Regional Leagues (ERL). The EMEA Masters is the most important tournament in EMEA for teams outside the League of Legends EMEA Championship (LEC) franchise.

== History ==
=== EU LCS and EU CS ===
Up to and including 2018, the two top leagues in Europe were the European League of Legends Championship Series (EU LCS) and European Challenger Series (EU CS). To get into the EU LCS, one had to first get into EU CS through qualification. You could get into the qualifiers through a previous open qualification or by winning one of the national leagues. Once you got into EU CS, you had to take one of the first two or three (depending on the season) spots in the play-offs. After taking the right spot in the EU CS play-offs, the team would qualify for the Promotion Tournament, where it would face one of the weakest teams from the previous EU LCS season for a spot in the elite.

=== Transition from EU CS to EU Masters ===
After pressure from some organizations, Riot Games has decided to switch the EU LCS to a franchise model, as well as rebranding the league into the League of Legends European Championship (LEC) from early 2019. With the transition to a franchise model from 2019, the possibility of promotion to the LEC ceased to exist, making Challenger Series an unnecessary competition. Nonetheless, there were regional leagues across Europe, which until now offered the chance to climb the European league hierarchy. With most European organizations left without an international competition (only 10 teams joined the newly formed franchise), it was decided to create a new Champions League-style competition. The competition was called the European Masters (EU Masters), and the best teams from all European Regional Leagues (ERL) would play in it.

=== Expansion from EU to EMEA ===
In late 2022, Riot Games announced the expansion of the European region to include the Middle East and North Africa. The League of Legends European Championship franchise was renamed League of Legends EMEA Championship, and the European Masters was renamed EMEA Masters.

With the expansion of the region, the Arabian League and Turkish Championship League were added to the EMEA Masters ecosystem. The format of the tournament itself has not changed.

== EMEA Regional Leagues ==
League	Country / Region
LES	Spain
LFL	France
PRM	Germany, Austria and Switzerland
NLC	United Kingdom, Ireland, Iceland, Sweden, Norway, Denmark and Finland
TCL	Turkey
AL	Saudi Arabia, Egypt, United Arab Emirates and Morocco
LIT	Italy
LPLOL	Portugal
EBL	Serbia, Croatia, Bosnia and Herzegovina, Montenegro, Hungary, Romania, Bulgaria, North Macedonia and Albania
HM	Czech Republic and Slovakia
HLL	Greece and Cyprus
RL	Poland, Ukraine, Israel, Georgia, Lithuania, Latvia and Estonia
ROL	Netherlands, Belgium and Luxembourg

== List of European/EMEA Masters finals ==
List of European/EMEA Masters finals
Season	Champion	Score	Runner-up
Season	Team	Score	Team
European Masters
2018 Spring	Origen	3–0	Illuminar Gaming
2018 Summer	MAD Lions	3–0	Ninjas in Pyjamas
2019 Spring	Misfits Premier	3–0	SK Gaming Prime
2019 Summer	Berlin International Gaming	3–1	Vodafone Giants
2020 Spring	LDLC OL	3–0	K1CK Neosurf
2020 Summer	AGO Rogue	3–0	GamerLegion
2021 Spring	Karmine Corp	3–1	BT Excel
2021 Summer	Karmine Corp	3–2	Fnatic Rising
2022 Spring	Karmine Corp	3–1	LDLC OL
2022 Summer	Team Heretics	3–2	Team BDS Academy
EMEA Masters
2023 Spring	Istanbul Wildcats	3–2	Unicorns of Love Sexy Edition
2023 Summer	Karmine Corp	3–2	Movistar Riders
2024 Spring	Eintracht Spandau	3–1	Beşiktaş Esports
2024 Summer	Team BDS Academy	3–1	Vitality.Bee
2025 Winter	Los Ratones	3–0	Ici Japon Corp. Esport
2025 Spring	Los Ratones	3–0	Barça eSports
2025 Summer	Karmine Corp Blue	3–0	Los Heretics
2026 Winter	Solary	3–0	Galions
2026 Spring	Galions	3–0	Solary
2026 Summer	Galions	3–2	Solary
