= 2025 Mid-Season Invitational =

International League of Legends tournament

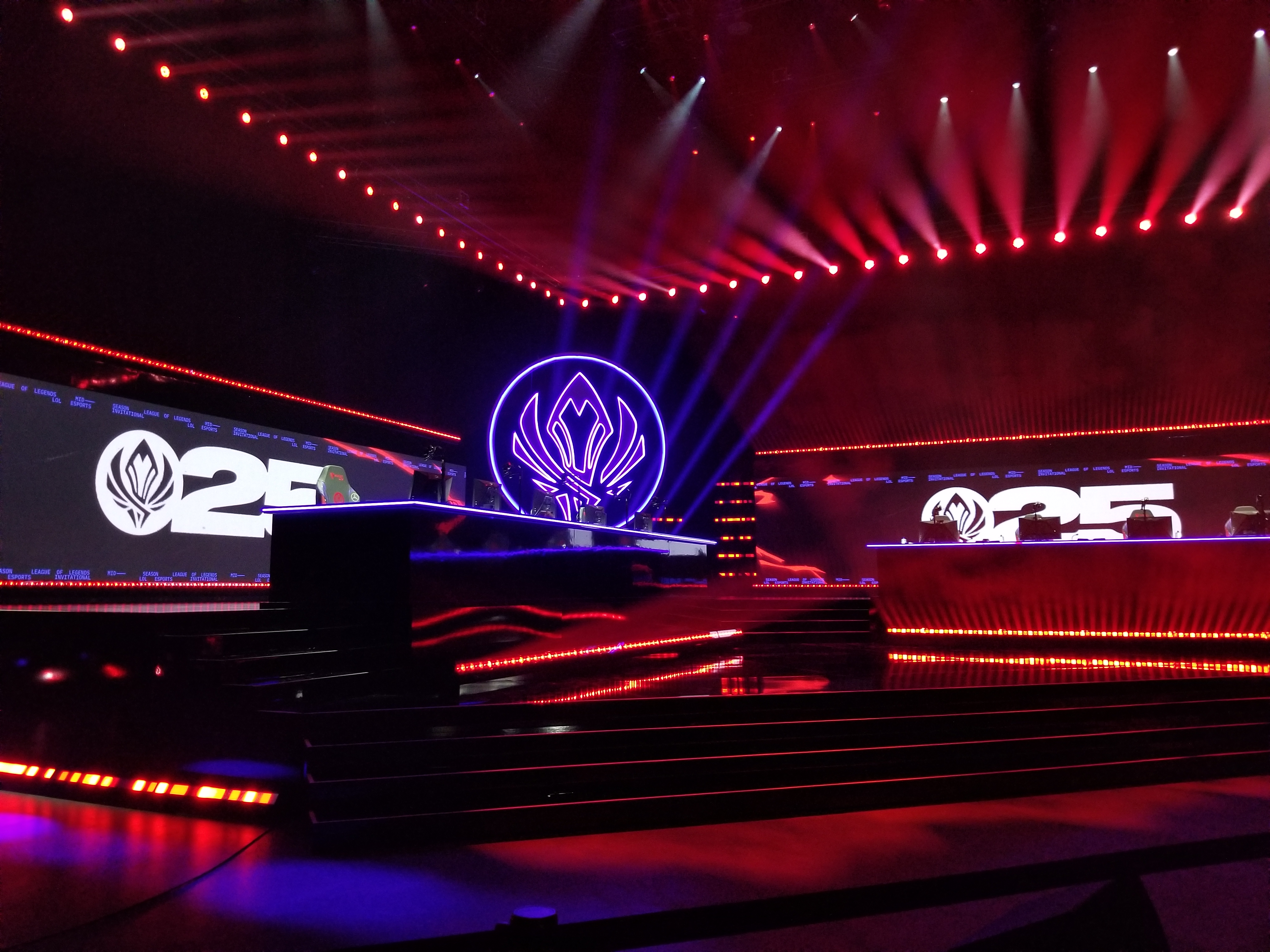
- The event stage inside Pacific Coliseum

Tournament information
- Sport: League of Legends
- Location: Vancouver, Canada
- Dates: June 27–July 12, 2025
- Administrator: Riot Games
- Venue: Pacific Coliseum
- Teams: 10
- Purse: US$2,000,000

Final positions
- Champions: Gen.G
- Runner-up: T1
- MVP: Jung "Chovy" Ji-hoon (Gen.G)

The 2025 Mid-Season Invitational was the tenth iteration of the Mid-Season Invitational (MSI), a Riot Games–organized tournament for League of Legends, a multiplayer online battle arena video game. The tournament was played in Vancouver, Canada from June 27 to July 12, 2025, and was Canada's first hosting of an international League of Legends competition. It was also the first edition of the tournament to feature the Fearless Draft format, and the first to be staged under the game's new competitive esports calendar since 2025.

Nineteen best-of-five series were played during the tournament, nine of which reached a fifth and deciding game, setting the record for the most number of game five's in any international League of Legends competition, surpassing the six game-fives witnessed during the 2021 League of Legends World Championship.

Gen.G of the League of Legends Champions Korea (LCK) successfully defended their title, defeating fellow Korean representatives T1 with a 3–2 scoreline to win their second consecutive MSI title. They became the third team to defend their MSI title, after T1 (then-SK Telecom T1) in 2017, and Royal Never Give Up in 2022.

== Host selection ==
During the media day for the 2024 League of Legends World Championship Final at The O2 Arena in London, United Kingdom on November 1, 2024, Riot Games announced that the 2025 edition of the Mid-Season Invitational will take place in Canada, with the host city being determined at the start of the 2025 competitive calendar. This will be Canada's first hosting of a major League of Legends tournament since the Finals of the 2017 North American League Championship Series (NA LCS) Spring Split, when it was held at the Pacific Coliseum in Vancouver, Canada.

Canada was originally slated to host the semi-final stage of the 2022 League of Legends World Championship at the Scotiabank Arena, Toronto. However, due to the impact of the COVID-19 pandemic in Canada on securing multi-entry visas, Riot Games announced the State Farm Arena in Atlanta, Georgia as its replacement venue.

== Qualification ==
The League of Legends Champions Korea (LCK), League of Legends Pro League (LPL), League of Legends EMEA Championship (LEC), League of Legends Championship of The Americas (LTA), and the League of Legends Championship Pacific (LCP) had two qualified teams each. The LCK, by virtue of Hanwha Life Esports winning the First Stand Tournament, had its two qualified teams placed in the Bracket Stage, while the other four regions each had one team in the Play-In and one team in the Bracket Stage.

This was the first Mid-Season Invitational featuring the LCP, a new Asia-Pacific league consisting of a merger between the Pacific Championship Series (PCS), Vietnam Championship Series (VCS), League of Legends Japan League (LJL) and League of Legends Circuit Oceania (LCO). This will also be the first and only MSI edition featuring the LTA, a merger between the League Championship Series (LCS), Campeonato Brasileiro de League of Legends (CBLOL), and Liga Latinoamérica (LLA). The LTA was announced to be discontinued on 28 September 2025, with the LCS and CBLOL returning in 2026.

=== Qualified teams ===
All qualified teams also advanced to the League of Legends tournament of the 2025 Esports World Cup. On May 26, 2025, G2 Esports of the LEC became the first team to qualify for the tournament, with CTBC Flying Oyster of the LCP following suit on June 1. Six days later on June 7, GAM Esports of the LCP and Movistar KOI of the LEC completed the list of qualified teams in their respective regions. The LPL's Anyone's Legend became the first team from the region to qualify on June 9, with Bilibili Gaming also confirming their qualification four days later on June 13.

Defending champions Gen.G of the LCK advanced to the tournament on June 13, with T1 of the LCK, FlyQuest of the LTA North, and FURIA of the LTA South completing the list of qualified teams on June 15.

Starting in the bracket stage
Region	League	Path	Team
South Korea	LCK	Road to MSI Qualification Match 1 winner	Gen.G
South Korea	LCK	Road to MSI Qualification Match 2 winner	T1
Asia-Pacific	LCP	Mid-Season champion	CTBC Flying Oyster
Europe	LEC	Spring Split champion	Movistar KOI
China	LPL	Stage 2 champion	Anyone's Legend
Americas	LTA	LTA North Split 2 champion	FlyQuest
Starting in the play-in stage
Region	League	Path	Team
Asia-Pacific	LCP	Mid-Season runner-up	GAM Esports
Europe	LEC	Spring Split runner-up	G2 Esports
China	LPL	Stage 2 runner-up	Bilibili Gaming
Americas	LTA	LTA South Split 2 champion	FURIA

== Venue ==
On January 8, 2025, Vancouver was announced as the host city in a development update video published to Riot Games' social media channels to commence the 2025 competitive season. The Pacific Coliseum, which was the site of 2017 NA LCS Spring Finals, was chosen as the venue of the tournament on March 20, 2025.

Vancouver, Canada
Pacific Coliseum
Capacity: 17,500
2025 Mid-Season Invitational (Canada)

== Format ==
All matches in the tournament across both play-in and bracket stages were best-of-five series.

Four of the ten teams started in the play-in stage — the second seeds from the LCP, LEC, and LPL, and the LTA South champions. Teams competed in a GSL-style double-elimination bracket and were seeded based on their region's performance during the 2025 First Stand Tournament, with the first two teams earning two wins advancing to the bracket stage. The two qualified teams from the play-in stage joined the top two seeds from the LCK, the first seeds from the LCP, LEC, and LPL, and the LTA North champions, where they competed in a double-elimination bracket. Matchups were determined at the conclusion of the play-in stage. The winning team of MSI 2025 qualified for the 2025 League of Legends World Championship, while the second-best performing region will also have an additional slot in the said tournament.

The 2025 Mid-Season Invitational was the first edition of the tournament to adopt the Fearless Draft format. Fearless Draft is an evolution of the traditional pick/ban system wherein champions picked in previous games of a best-of-series become unavailable for both teams in subsequent games. While Fearless Draft was originally intended to only be used during the first split of the season, Riot Games announced prior to the First Stand Tournament final that the rules would apply for the rest of the year after it received "overwhelming" positive feedback during the period.

== Play-in stage ==
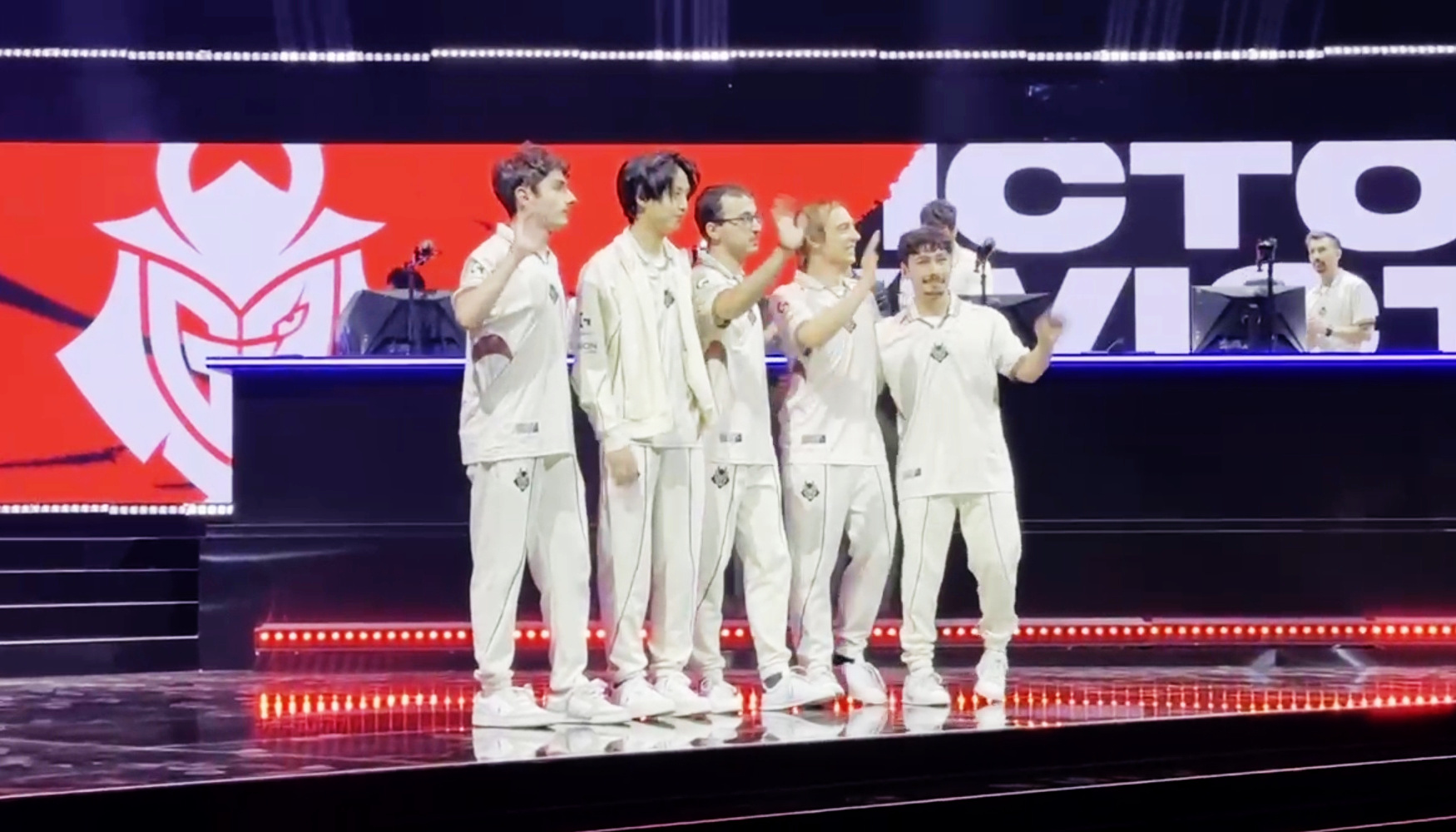
G2 Esports after defeating FURIA; from left to right: Labrov, Hans Sama, SkewMond, Caps, and BrokenBlade

- Date and time: June 27–29, began at 17:00 PDT (00:00 UTC)
  - Excluding games scheduled on June 27–28, which will begin at 12:00 PDT (19:00 UTC).
- Four teams placed in a GSL-style double-elimination format
- Seeding based on results from the 2025 First Stand Tournament
  - 2nd place: LEC; 3rd place: LCP; 4th place: LPL; 5th place: LTA
- All matches are best-of-five.
- Teams that earn two wins will advance to the bracket stage

=== Bracket ===
Round 1
June 27, 12:00 PDT
G2 Esports	3
FURIA	2
June 27, 17:00 PDT
Bilibili Gaming	3
GAM Esports	0
Lower Round 1
June 28, 12:00 PDT
FURIA	2
GAM Esports	3

Round 2
June 28, 17:00 PDT
G2 Esports	0
Bilibili Gaming	3
Lower Round 2
June 29, 17:00 PDT
G2 Esports	3
GAM Esports	2

Advance to bracket stage
Bilibili Gaming
G2 Esports

Source: LoL Esports

Round 1 Match 1	June 27	G2 Esports	3	–	2	FURIA	Vancouver, Canada
	12:00 (UTC-8)	Recap					Pacific Coliseum
		K/D/A: 4/17/6; Gold: 47.1K; Turrets: 4 Drakes: 1 Elder Dragons: 0 Barons: 0 Rift Heralds: 1 Voidgrubs: 0	Game 1; 28:06; FUR leads series 1–0			K/D/A: 17/4/43; Gold: 55.1K; Turrets: 7 Drakes: 3 Elder Dragons: 0 Barons: 1 Rift Heralds: 0 Voidgrubs: 3	
		K/D/A: 25/9/54; Gold: 72.4K; Turrets: 11; Drakes: 3 Elder Dragons: 0 Barons: 2 Rift Heralds: 1 Voidgrubs: 3	Game 2; 34:34; Series tied 1–1			K/D/A: 9/25/11; Gold: 60.4K; Turrets: 3 Drakes: 1 Elder Dragons: 0 Barons: 0 Rift Heralds: 0 Voidgrubs: 0	
		K/D/A: 21/17/50; Gold: 70.6K; Turrets: 10; Drakes: 2 Elder Dragons: 0 Barons: 1 Rift Heralds: 1 Voidgrubs: 0	Game 3; 36:57; G2 leads series 2–1			K/D/A: 17/21/36; Gold: 64.8K; Turrets: 4 Drakes: 3 Elder Dragons: 0 Barons: 1 Rift Heralds: 0 Voidgrubs: 3	
		K/D/A: 9/30/22; Gold: 54.0K; Turrets: 3 Drakes: 2 Elder Dragons: 0 Barons: 0 Rift Heralds: 1 Voidgrubs: 1	Game 4; 31:22; Series tied 2–2			K/D/A: 30/9/66; Gold: 64.1K; Turrets: 8 Drakes: 2 Elder Dragons: 0 Barons: 0 Rift Heralds: 0 Voidgrubs: 2	
		K/D/A: 20/3/50; Gold: 63.7K; Turrets: 10; Drakes: 4 Elder Dragons: 0 Barons: 1 Rift Heralds: 1 Voidgrubs: 0	Game 5; 30:20; G2 wins series 3–2			K/D/A: 3/20/5; Gold: 47.7K; Turrets: 2 Drakes: 1 Elder Dragons: 0 Barons: 0 Rift Heralds: 0 Voidgrubs: 3	

Round 1 Match 2	June 27	Bilibili Gaming	3	–	0	GAM Esports	Vancouver, Canada
	17:00 (UTC-8)	Recap					Pacific Coliseum
		K/D/A: 22/8/60; Gold: 59.0K; Turrets: 8 Drakes: 4 Elder Dragons: 0 Barons: 0 Rift Heralds: 1 Voidgrubs: 2	Game 1; 29:21; BLG leads series 1–0			K/D/A: 8/22/14; Gold: 46.4K; Turrets: 0 Drakes: 0 Elder Dragons: 0 Barons: 0 Rift Heralds: 0 Voidgrubs: 1	
		K/D/A: 22/11/68; Gold: 62.5K; Turrets: 9 Drakes: 4 Elder Dragons: 0 Barons: 1 Rift Heralds: 0 Voidgrubs: 0	Game 2; 31:24; BLG leads series 2–0			K/D/A: 11/22/33; Gold: 51.4K; Turrets: 3 Drakes: 0 Elder Dragons: 0 Barons: 0 Rift Heralds: 1 Voidgrubs: 3	
		K/D/A: 29/9/52; Gold: 58.3K; Turrets: 10; Drakes: 4 Elder Dragons: 0 Barons: 0 Rift Heralds: 1 Voidgrubs: 3	Game 3; 25:42; BLG wins series 3–0			K/D/A: 9/29/20; Gold: 42.9K; Turrets: 0 Drakes: 0 Elder Dragons: 0 Barons: 0 Rift Heralds: 0 Voidgrubs: 0	

Lower Round 1 Match 3	June 28	FURIA	2	–	3	GAM Esports	Vancouver, Canada
	12:00 (UTC-8)	Recap					Pacific Coliseum
		K/D/A: 16/30/43; Gold: 78.8K; Turrets: 5 Drakes: 2 Elder Dragons: 0 Barons: 1 Rift Heralds: 0 Voidgrubs: 0	Game 1; 45:17; GAM leads series 1–0			K/D/A: 30/16/91; Gold: 86.1K; Turrets: 8 Drakes: 4 Elder Dragons: 1 Barons: 1 Rift Heralds: 1 Voidgrubs: 3	
		K/D/A: 23/4/47; Gold: 58.3K; Turrets: 11; Drakes: 3<br>Elder Dragons: 0 Barons: 1 Rift Heralds: 1 Voidgrubs: 2	Game 2; 27:18; Series tied 1–1			K/D/A: 4/23/9; Gold: 44.6K; Turrets: 1 Drakes: 1 Elder Dragons: 0 Barons: 0 Rift Heralds: 0 Voidgrubs: 1	
		K/D/A: 14/6/38; Gold: 55.0K; Turrets: 9 Drakes: 2 Elder Dragons: 0 Barons: 1 Rift Heralds: 0 Voidgrubs: 3	Game 3; 27:50; FUR leads series 2–1			K/D/A: 6/15/10; Gold: 48.7K; Turrets: 5 Drakes: 2 Elder Dragons: 0 Barons: 0 Rift Heralds: 1 Voidgrubs: 0	
		K/D/A: 9/22/20; Gold: 58.9K; Turrets: 3 Drakes: 2 Elder Dragons: 0 Barons: 0 Rift Heralds: 0 Voidgrubs: 0	Game 4; 35:05; Series tied 2–2			K/D/A: 22/9/53; Gold: 69.0K; Turrets: 8 Drakes: 3 Elder Dragons: 0 Barons: 1 Rift Heralds: 1 Voidgrubs: 3	
		K/D/A: 6/19/17; Gold: 58.9K; Turrets: 2 Drakes: 1 Elder Dragons: 0 Barons: 1 Rift Heralds: 0 Voidgrubs: 3	Game 5; 36:32; GAM wins series 3–2			K/D/A: 19/6/51; Gold: 72.5K; Turrets: 9 Drakes: 4 Elder Dragons: 1 Barons: 0 Rift Heralds: 1 Voidgrubs: 3	

Round 2 Match 4	June 28	G2 Esports	0	–	3	Bilibili Gaming	Vancouver, Canada
	17:00 (UTC-8)	Recap					Pacific Coliseum
		K/D/A: 11/18/27; Gold: 61.9K; Turrets: 7 Drakes: 2 Elder Dragons: 0 Barons: 0 Rift Heralds: 0 Voidgrubs: 2	Game 1; 35:21; BLG leads series 1–0			K/D/A: 18/11/37; Gold: 67.1K; Turrets: 10; Drakes: 2 Elder Dragons: 0 Barons: 1 Rift Heralds: 1 Voidgrubs: 1	
		K/D/A: 9/20/20; Gold: 51.9K; Turrets: 3 Drakes: 0 Elder Dragons: 0 Barons: 0 Rift Heralds: 0 Voidgrubs: 2	Game 2; 30:07; BLG leads series 2–0			K/D/A: 20/9/39; Gold: 59.4K; Turrets: 9 Drakes: 4 Elder Dragons: 0 Barons: 1 Rift Heralds: 1 Voidgrubs: 1	
		K/D/A: 2/17/3; Gold: 54.6K; Turrets: 3 Drakes: 1 Elder Dragons: 0 Barons: 0 Rift Heralds: 0 Voidgrubs: 3	Game 3; 33:28; BLG wins series 3–0			K/D/A: 17/2/41; Gold: 67.9K; Turrets: 10; Drakes: 3 Elder Dragons: 0 Barons: 1 Rift Heralds: 1 Voidgrubs: 0	

Lower Round 2 Match 5	June 29	G2 Esports	3	–	2	GAM Esports	Vancouver, Canada
	17:00 (UTC-8)						Pacific Coliseum
		K/D/A: 14/10/44; Gold: 57.4K; Turrets: 8 Drakes: 2 Elder Dragons: 0 Barons: 0 Rift Heralds: 1 Voidgrubs: 3	Game 1; 28:48; G2 leads series 1–0			K/D/A: 10/14/20; Gold: 50.3K; Turrets: 4 Drakes: 1 Elder Dragons: 0 Barons: 0 Rift Heralds: 0 Voidgrubs: 3	
		K/D/A: 25/12/60; Gold: 66.8K; Turrets: 11; Drakes: 2 Elder Dragons: 0 Barons: 1 Rift Heralds: 0 Voidgrubs: 1	Game 2; 31:28; G2 leads series 2–0			K/D/A: 12/25/31; Gold: 55.6K; Turrets: 3 Drakes: 3 Elder Dragons: 0 Barons: 0 Rift Heralds: 1 Voidgrubs: 2	
		K/D/A: 6/18/7; Gold: 57.6K; Turrets: 6 Drakes: 2 Elder Dragons: 0 Barons: 0 Rift Heralds: 1 Voidgrubs: 3	Game 3; 32:38; G2 leads series 2–1			K/D/A: 18/6/39; Gold: 66.4K; Turrets: 9 Drakes: 3 Elder Dragons: 0 Barons: 1 Rift Heralds: 0 Voidgrubs: 0	
		K/D/A: 5/15/5; Gold: 55.1K; Turrets: 4 Drakes: 0 Elder Dragons: 0 Barons: 0 Rift Heralds: 0 Voidgrubs: 3	Game 4; 32:57; Series tied 2–2			K/D/A: 15/5/40; Gold: 63.7K; Turrets: 7 Drakes: 4 Elder Dragons: 1 Barons: 1 Rift Heralds: 1 Voidgrubs: 0	
		K/D/A: 11/2/31; Gold: 66.1K; Turrets: 10; Drakes: 3 Elder Dragons: 0 Barons: 1 Rift Heralds: 1 Voidgrubs: 3	Game 5; 35:24; G2 wins series 3–2			K/D/A: 2/11/41; Gold: 55.1K; Turrets: 3 Drakes: 2 Elder Dragons: 0 Barons: 0 Rift Heralds: 0 Voidgrubs: 0	

== Bracket stage ==
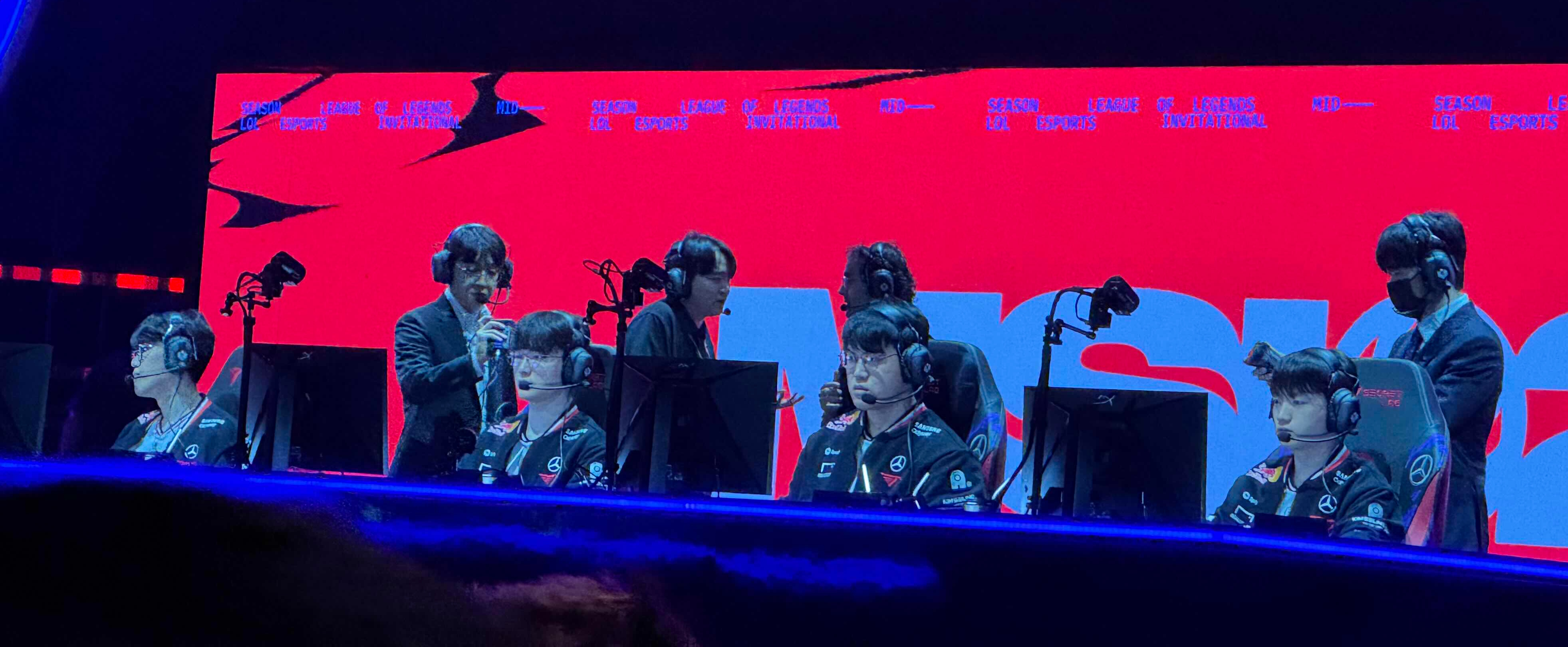
T1 preparing for their match against Bilibili Gaming (Oner, Faker, Gumayusi, and Keria pictured above)

=== Draw ===
Following the conclusion of the play-in stage, a draw was originally scheduled to be conducted for the bracket stage. The eight qualified teams were divided into the following four tiers:

Tier 1

- Gen.G
- Movistar KOI

Tier 2

- CTBC Flying Oyster
- Anyone's Legend

Tier 3

- FlyQuest
- T1

Tier 4

- Bilibili Gaming
- G2 Esports

As G2 and BLG were able to qualify for the bracket stage, no draw was conducted to ensure no intra-regional matches can take place in the first rounds of both upper and lower brackets, and the first round of the latter. Hence, T1 and Gen.G of the LCK, and Anyone's Legend and Bilibili Gaming of the LPL are in opposite brackets each.

=== Bracket ===
- Date and time: July 1–12, will begin at 17:00 PDT (00:00 UTC)
  - Excluding games scheduled on July 3–5, which will begin at 12:00 PDT (19:00 UTC).
- Eight teams will be drawn into four tiers where teams in Tier 1 will face teams from Tier 4, while teams from Tier 2 will go up against teams from Tier 3
- Teams from the same region are to be placed on opposite bracket sides
- Double elimination; all matches are best-of-five.

Upper Round 1	Upper Round 2	Upper Final	Grand Final
July 1, 17:00 PDT
Gen.G	3
July 4, 15:00 PDT
G2 Esports	1
Gen.G	3
July 2, 17:00 PDT
Anyone's Legend	2
Anyone's Legend	3
July 9, 17:00 PDT
FlyQuest	1
Gen.G	3
July 3, 16:00 PDT
T1	2
CTBC Flying Oyster	2
July 5, 16:00 PDT
T1	3
T1	3
July 3, 12:00 PDT
Bilibili Gaming	0
Movistar KOI	1	July 12, 17:00 PDT
Bilibili Gaming	3	Gen.G	3
T1	2
Lower Round 1	Lower Round 2	Lower Round 3	Lower Final
July 8, 17:00 PDT
July 4, 12:00 PDT	Bilibili Gaming	3	July 11, 17:00 PDT
G2 Esports	0	FlyQuest	2	July 10, 17:00 PDT	T1	3
FlyQuest	3	Bilibili Gaming	0	Anyone's Legend	2
July 7, 17:00 PDT	Anyone's Legend	3
July 5, 12:00 PDT	Anyone's Legend	3
CTBC Flying Oyster	3	CTBC Flying Oyster	1
Movistar KOI	1

Source: LoL Esports

Upper Round 1 Match 6	July 1	Gen.G	3	–	1	G2 Esports	Vancouver, Canada
	17:00 (UTC-8)						Pacific Coliseum
		K/D/A: 4/22/8; Gold: 52.8K; Turrets: 2 Drakes: 0 Elder Dragons: 0 Barons: 1 Rift Heralds: 1 Voidgrubs: 3	Game 1; 32:08; G2 leads series 1–0			K/D/A: 22/4/61; Gold: 65.1K; Turrets: 9 Drakes: 4 Elder Dragons: 1 Barons: 0 Rift Heralds: 0 Voidgrubs: 0	
		K/D/A: 27/11/64; Gold: 69.6K; Turrets: 11; Drakes: 4 Elder Dragons: 0 Barons: 1 Rift Heralds: 1 Voidgrubs: 3	Game 2; 31:59; Series tied 1–1			K/D/A: 11/27/31; Gold: 53.1K; Turrets: 0 Drakes: 1 Elder Dragons: 0 Barons: 0 Rift Heralds: 0 Voidgrubs: 0	
		K/D/A: 14/3/20; Gold: 54.7K; Turrets: 8 Drakes: 3 Elder Dragons: 0 Barons: 0 Rift Heralds: 1 Voidgrubs: 3	Game 3; 27:25; GEN leads series 2–1			K/D/A: 3/14/4; Gold: 43.1K; Turrets: 1 Drakes: 1 Elder Dragons: 0 Barons: 0 Rift Heralds: 0 Voidgrubs: 0	
		K/D/A: 16/11/34; Gold: 61.1K; Turrets: 10; Drakes: 3 Elder Dragons: 0 Barons: 1 Rift Heralds: 1 Voidgrubs: 3	Game 4; 30:36; GEN wins series 3–1			K/D/A: 11/16/23; Gold: 53.3K; Turrets: 1 Drakes: 2 Elder Dragons: 0 Barons: 0 Rift Heralds: 0 Voidgrubs: 0	

Upper Round 1 Match 7	July 2	Anyone's Legend	3	–	1	FlyQuest	Vancouver, Canada
	17:00 (UTC-8)						Pacific Coliseum
		K/D/A: 7/28/15; Gold: 59.1K; Turrets: 2 Drakes: 1 Elder Dragons: 0 Barons: 0 Rift Heralds: 1 Voidgrubs: 3	Game 1; 35:36; FLY leads series 1–0			K/D/A: 28/7/79; Gold: 72.1K; Turrets: 9 Drakes: 4 Elder Dragons: 0 Barons: 2 Rift Heralds: 0 Voidgrubs: 0	
		K/D/A: 18/6/34; Gold: 59.1K; Turrets: 11; Drakes: 3 Elder Dragons: 0 Barons: 1 Rift Heralds: 1 Voidgrubs: 3	Game 2; 27:47; Series tied 1–1			K/D/A: 6/18/9; Gold: 45.1K; Turrets: 1 Drakes: 0 Elder Dragons: 0 Barons: 0 Rift Heralds: 0 Voidgrubs: 0	
		K/D/A: 20/14/63; Gold: 72.0K; Turrets: 9 Drakes: 4 Elder Dragons: 0 Barons: 2 Rift Heralds: 1 Voidgrubs: 3	Game 3; 35:23; AL leads series 2–1			K/D/A: 14/20/39; Gold: 66.7K; Turrets: 3 Drakes: 0 Elder Dragons: 0 Barons: 0 Rift Heralds: 0 Voidgrubs: 0	
		K/D/A: 33/12/77; Gold: 71.0K; Turrets: 9 Drakes: 2 Elder Dragons: 0 Barons: 1 Rift Heralds: 1 Voidgrubs: 3	Game 4; 32:57; AL wins series 3–1			K/D/A: 12/33/29; Gold: 66.7K; Turrets: 2 Drakes: 2 Elder Dragons: 0 Barons: 0 Rift Heralds: 0 Voidgrubs: 0	

Upper Round 1 Match 8	July 3	Movistar KOI	1	–	3	Bilibili Gaming	Vancouver, Canada
	12:00 (UTC-8)						Pacific Coliseum
		K/D/A: 10/23/28; Gold: 59.7K; Turrets: 0 Drakes: 1 Elder Dragons: 0 Barons: 0 Rift Heralds: 0 Voidgrubs: 1	Game 1; 36:23; BLG leads series 1–0			K/D/A: 23/10/55; Gold: 75.7K; Turrets: 10; Drakes: 4 Elder Dragons: 0 Barons: 1 Rift Heralds: 1 Voidgrubs: 2	
		K/D/A: 22/10/43; Gold: 63.5K; Turrets: 9 Drakes: 2 Elder Dragons: 0 Barons: 1 Rift Heralds: 1 Voidgrubs: 0	Game 2; 30:38; Series tied 1–1			K/D/A: 10/22/24; Gold: 51.7K; Turrets: 2 Drakes: 2 Elder Dragons: 0 Barons: 0 Rift Heralds: 0 Voidgrubs: 3	
		K/D/A: 7/17/20; Gold: 64.5K; Turrets: 2 Drakes: 0 Elder Dragons: 0 Barons: 1 Rift Heralds: 0 Voidgrubs: 0	Game 3; 37:21; BLG leads series 2–1			K/D/A: 17/7/32; Gold: 75.4K; Turrets: 10; Drakes: 4 Elder Dragons: 1 Barons: 1 Rift Heralds: 1 Voidgrubs: 3	
		K/D/A: 11/9/23; Gold: 72.8K; Turrets: 5 Drakes: 4 Elder Dragons: 0 Barons: 1 Rift Heralds: 1 Voidgrubs: 0	Game 4; 40:04; BLG wins series 3–1			K/D/A: 9/11/27; Gold: 72.8K; Turrets: 7 Drakes: 2 Elder Dragons: 0 Barons: 1 Rift Heralds: 0 Voidgrubs: 3	

Upper Round 1 Match 9	July 3	CTBC Flying Oyster	2	–	3	T1	Vancouver, Canada
	16:00 (UTC-8)						Pacific Coliseum
		K/D/A: 15/26/29; Gold: 64.8K; Turrets: 2 Drakes: 2 Elder Dragons: 0 Barons: 1 Rift Heralds: 1 Voidgrubs: 2	Game 1; 36:36; T1 leads series 1–0			K/D/A: 26/15/58; Gold: 77.2K; Turrets: 10; Drakes: 3 Elder Dragons: 0 Barons: 1 Rift Heralds: 0 Voidgrubs: 1	
		K/D/A: 24/3/63; Gold: 59.4K; Turrets: 10; Drakes: 2 Elder Dragons: 0 Barons: 1 Rift Heralds: 1 Voidgrubs: 2	Game 2; 27:55; Series tied 1–1			K/D/A: 3/24/5; Gold: 42.8K; Turrets: 0 Drakes: 2 Elder Dragons: 0 Barons: 0 Rift Heralds: 0 Voidgrubs: 1	
		K/D/A: 20/6/55; Gold: 58.9K; Turrets: 9 Drakes: 4 Elder Dragons: 0 Barons: 1 Rift Heralds: 1 Voidgrubs: 3	Game 3; 29:47; CFO leads series 2–1			K/D/A: 6/20/16; Gold: 50.9K; Turrets: 3 Drakes: 0 Elder Dragons: 0 Barons: 0 Rift Heralds: 0 Voidgrubs: 0	
		K/D/A: 19/34/38; Gold: 68.4K; Turrets: 2 Drakes: 3 Elder Dragons: 0 Barons: 1 Rift Heralds: 0 Voidgrubs: 1	Game 4; 38:03; Series tied 2–2			K/D/A: 34/19/93; Gold: 76.7K; Turrets: 8 Drakes: 3 Elder Dragons: 0 Barons: 0 Rift Heralds: 1 Voidgrubs: 2	
		K/D/A: 3/21/7; Gold: 40.2K; Turrets: 1 Drakes: 2 Elder Dragons: 0 Barons: 0 Rift Heralds: 0 Voidgrubs: 1	Game 5; 25:00; T1 wins series 3–2			K/D/A: 20/3/47; Gold: 53.3K; Turrets: 10; Drakes: 1 Elder Dragons: 0 Barons: 0 Rift Heralds: 1 Voidgrubs: 2	

Lower Round 1 Match 10	July 4	G2 Esports	0	–	3	FlyQuest	Vancouver, Canada
	12:00 (UTC-8)						Pacific Coliseum
		K/D/A: 7/14/20; Gold: 63.7K; Turrets: 2 Drakes: 3 Elder Dragons: 0 Barons: 1 Rift Heralds: 0 Voidgrubs: 0	Game 1; 38:43; FLY leads series 1–0			K/D/A: 14/7/39; Gold: 71.1K; Turrets: 10; Drakes: 3 Elder Dragons: 0 Barons: 1 Rift Heralds: 1 Voidgrubs: 3	
		K/D/A: 15/24/34; Gold: 65.2K; Turrets: 4 Drakes: 1 Elder Dragons: 0 Barons: 0 Rift Heralds: 1 Voidgrubs: 0	Game 2; 38:36; FLY leads series 2–0			K/D/A: 23/15/62; Gold: 77.4K; Turrets: 9 Drakes: 4 Elder Dragons: 1 Barons: 2 Rift Heralds: 0 Voidgrubs: 3	
		K/D/A: 5/10/4; Gold: 47.2K; Turrets: 2 Drakes: 2 Elder Dragons: 0 Barons: 0 Rift Heralds: 0 Voidgrubs: 0	Game 3; 28:50; FLY wins series 3–0			K/D/A: 10/5/26; Gold: 52.6K; Turrets: 7 Drakes: 1 Elder Dragons: 0 Barons: 0 Rift Heralds: 1 Voidgrubs: 3	

Upper Round 2 Match 11	July 4	Gen.G	3	–	2	Anyone's Legend	Vancouver, Canada
	15:00 (UTC-8)						Pacific Coliseum
		K/D/A: 6/22/16; Gold: 42.6K; Turrets: 1 Drakes: 1 Elder Dragons: 0 Barons: 0 Rift Heralds: 0 Voidgrubs: 1	Game 1; 27:09; AL leads series 1–0			K/D/A: 22/6/58; Gold: 54.0K; Turrets: 7 Drakes: 2 Elder Dragons: 0 Barons: 0 Rift Heralds: 1 Voidgrubs: 2	
		K/D/A: 17/6/56; Gold: 58.6K; Turrets: 9 Drakes: 4 Elder Dragons: 0 Barons: 0 Rift Heralds: 0 Voidgrubs: 0	Game 2; 28:56; Series tied 1–1			K/D/A: 6/17/15; Gold: 50.3K; Turrets: 2 Drakes: 0 Elder Dragons: 0 Barons: 1 Rift Heralds: 1 Voidgrubs: 3	
		K/D/A: 17/10/50; Gold: 66.7K; Turrets: 8 Drakes: 3 Elder Dragons: 0 Barons: 1 Rift Heralds: 0 Voidgrubs: 0	Game 3; 34:04; GEN leads series 2–1			K/D/A: 10/17/22; Gold: 58.1K; Turrets: 1 Drakes: 2 Elder Dragons: 0 Barons: 0 Rift Heralds: 1 Voidgrubs: 3	
		K/D/A: 4/15/7; Gold: 48.6K; Turrets: 1 Drakes: 2 Elder Dragons: 0 Barons: 0 Rift Heralds: 0 Voidgrubs: 0	Game 4; 30:58; Series tied 2–2			K/D/A: 15/4/47; Gold: 63.0K; Turrets: 9 Drakes: 2 Elder Dragons: 0 Barons: 1 Rift Heralds: 1 Voidgrubs: 3	
		K/D/A: 19/6/58; Gold: 58.0K; Turrets: 8 Drakes: 3 Elder Dragons: 0 Barons: 1 Rift Heralds: 0 Voidgrubs: 2	Game 5; 28:44; GEN wins series 3–2			K/D/A: 9/19/17; Gold: 47.0K; Turrets: 2 Drakes: 0 Elder Dragons: 0 Barons: 0 Rift Heralds: 1 Voidgrubs: 1	

Lower Round 1 Match 12	July 5	CTBC Flying Oyster	3	–	1	Movistar KOI	Vancouver, Canada
	12:00 (UTC-8)						Pacific Coliseum
		K/D/A: 12/6/25; Gold: 70.5K; Turrets: 10; Drakes: 3 Elder Dragons: 0 Barons: 1 Rift Heralds: 1 Voidgrubs: 2	Game 1; 37:04; CFO leads series 1–0			K/D/A: 6/12/17; Gold: 61.9K; Turrets: 2 Drakes: 3 Elder Dragons: 0 Barons: 0 Rift Heralds: 0 Voidgrubs: 1	
		K/D/A: 21/7/59; Gold: 69.2K; Turrets: 10; Drakes: 4 Elder Dragons: 0 Barons: 2 Rift Heralds: 0 Voidgrubs: 1	Game 2; 33:29; CFO leads series 2–0			K/D/A: 7/21/13; Gold: 57.6K; Turrets: 2 Drakes: 1 Elder Dragons: 0 Barons: 0 Rift Heralds: 1 Voidgrubs: 2	
		K/D/A: 9/22/14; Gold: 48.2K; Turrets: 2 Drakes: 1 Elder Dragons: 0 Barons: 0 Rift Heralds: 0 Voidgrubs: 0	Game 3; 27:49; CFO leads series 2–1			K/D/A: 22/9/42; Gold: 59.3K; Turrets: 8 Drakes: 3 Elder Dragons: 0 Barons: 1 Rift Heralds: 1 Voidgrubs: 3	
		K/D/A: 14/6/34; Gold: 62.3K; Turrets: 9 Drakes: 4 Elder Dragons: 0 Barons: 1 Rift Heralds: 1 Voidgrubs: 3	Game 4; 31:58; CFO wins series 3–1			K/D/A: 6/14/11; Gold: 52.1K; Turrets: 1 Drakes: 1 Elder Dragons: 0 Barons: 0 Rift Heralds: 0 Voidgrubs: 0	

Upper Round 2 Match 13	July 5	Bilibili Gaming	0	–	3	T1	Vancouver, Canada
	16:00 (UTC-8)						Pacific Coliseum
		K/D/A: 8/22/17; Gold: 43.3K; Turrets: 0 Drakes: 0 Elder Dragons: 0 Barons: 0 Rift Heralds: 0 Voidgrubs: 3	Game 1; 26:57; T1 leads series 1–0			K/D/A: 22/8/52; Gold: 56.3K; Turrets: 10; Drakes: 4 Elder Dragons: 0 Barons: 1 Rift Heralds: 1 Voidgrubs: 0	
		K/D/A: 11/16/20; Gold: 58.1K; Turrets: 3 Drakes: 1 Elder Dragons: 0 Barons: 0 Rift Heralds: 1 Voidgrubs: 3	Game 2; 33:36; T1 leads series 2–0			K/D/A: 16/11/42; Gold: 66.3K; Turrets: 9 Drakes: 4 Elder Dragons: 0 Barons: 1 Rift Heralds: 0 Voidgrubs: 0	
		K/D/A: 12/18/30; Gold: 57.2K; Turrets: 2 Drakes: 0 Elder Dragons: 0 Barons: 0 Rift Heralds: 1 Voidgrubs: 0	Game 2; 33:30; T1 wins series 3–0			K/D/A: 18/12/49; Gold: 63.8K; Turrets: 9 Drakes: 4 Elder Dragons: 0 Barons: 1 Rift Heralds: 0 Voidgrubs: 3	

Lower Round 2 Match 14	July 7	Anyone's Legend	3	–	1	CTBC Flying Oyster	Vancouver, Canada
	17:00 (UTC-8)						Pacific Coliseum
		K/D/A: 14/6/37; Gold: 66.1K; Turrets: 8 Drakes: 3 Elder Dragons: 0 Barons: 0 Rift Heralds: 1 Voidgrubs: 3	Game 1; 35:35; AL leads series 1–0			K/D/A: 6/14/10; Gold: 60.0K; Turrets: 2 Drakes: 3 Elder Dragons: 0 Barons: 0 Rift Heralds: 0 Voidgrubs: 0	
		K/D/A: 22/15/52; Gold: 80.5K; Turrets: 9 Drakes: 4 Elder Dragons: 1 Barons: 1 Rift Heralds: 1 Voidgrubs: 1	Game 2; 41:29; AL leads series 2–0			K/D/A: 15/22/39; Gold: 77.0K; Turrets: 7 Drakes: 0 Elder Dragons: 1 Barons: 2 Rift Heralds: 0 Voidgrubs: 2	
		K/D/A: 8/19/24; Gold: 55.5K; Turrets: 1 Drakes: 1 Elder Dragons: 0 Barons: 0 Rift Heralds: 0 Voidgrubs: 3	Game 3; 33:29; AL leads series 2–1			K/D/A: 19/8/45; Gold: 64.5K; Turrets: 8 Drakes: 4 Elder Dragons: 0 Barons: 1 Rift Heralds: 1 Voidgrubs: 0	
		K/D/A: 15/6/44; Gold: 59.7K; Turrets: 9 Drakes: 2 Elder Dragons: 0 Barons: 1 Rift Heralds: 0 Voidgrubs: 2	Game 4; 29:36; AL wins series 3–1			K/D/A: 6/15/8; Gold: 47.6K; Turrets: 3 Drakes: 2 Elder Dragons: 0 Barons: 0 Rift Heralds: 1 Voidgrubs: 1	

Lower Round 2 Match 15	July 8	Bilibili Gaming	3	–	2	FlyQuest	Vancouver, Canada
	17:00 (UTC-8)						Pacific Coliseum
		K/D/A: 9/23/23; Gold: 57.8K; Turrets: 2 Drakes: 3 Elder Dragons: 0 Barons: 0 Rift Heralds: 0 Voidgrubs: 3	Game 1; 36:22; FLY leads series 1–0			K/D/A: 23/9/54; Gold: 70.8K; Turrets: 11; Drakes: 2 Elder Dragons: 0 Barons: 1 Rift Heralds: 1 Voidgrubs: 0	
		K/D/A: 24/13/58; Gold: 63.3K; Turrets: 9 Drakes: 4 Elder Dragons: 0 Barons: 1 Rift Heralds: 1 Voidgrubs: 0	Game 2; 30:04; Series tied 1–1			K/D/A: 13/24/29; Gold: 51.6K; Turrets: 2 Drakes: 0 Elder Dragons: 0 Barons: 0 Rift Heralds: 0 Voidgrubs: 3	
		K/D/A: 21/20/54; Gold: 75.2K; Turrets: 10; Drakes: 3 Elder Dragons: 0 Barons: 1 Rift Heralds: 1 Voidgrubs: 3	Game 3; 37:25; BLG leads series 2–1			K/D/A: 20/21/59; Gold: 70.8K; Turrets: 5 Drakes: 3 Elder Dragons: 0 Barons: 1 Rift Heralds: 0 Voidgrubs: 0	
		K/D/A: 6/23/7; Gold: 48.0K; Turrets: 2 Drakes: 0 Elder Dragons: 0 Barons: 0 Rift Heralds: 0 Voidgrubs: 2	Game 4; 28:21; Series tied 2–2			K/D/A: 23/6/58; Gold: 57.1K; Turrets: 9 Drakes: 4 Elder Dragons: 0 Barons: 1 Rift Heralds: 1 Voidgrubs: 1	
		K/D/A: 31/5/83; Gold: 66.4K; Turrets: 11; Drakes: 4 Elder Dragons: 0 Barons: 1 Rift Heralds: 1 Voidgrubs: 3	Game 5; 31:31; BLG wins series 3–2			K/D/A: 5/31/10; Gold: 46.9K; Turrets: 0 Drakes: 0 Elder Dragons: 0 Barons: 0 Rift Heralds: 0 Voidgrubs: 0	

Upper Final; Match 16	July 9	Gen.G	3	–	2	T1	Vancouver, Canada
	17:00 (UTC-8)						Pacific Coliseum
		K/D/A: 21/8/56; Gold: 68.5K; Turrets: 8 Drakes: 4 Elder Dragons: 0 Barons: 0 Rift Heralds: 1 Voidgrubs: 2	Game 1; 35:30; GEN leads series 1–0			K/D/A: 8/21/13; Gold: 59.1K; Turrets: 3 Drakes: 1 Elder Dragons: 0 Barons: 0 Rift Heralds: 0 Voidgrubs: 1	
		K/D/A: 14/30/40; Gold: 49.8K; Turrets: 1 Drakes: 0 Elder Dragons: 0 Barons: 0 Rift Heralds: 0 Voidgrubs: 0	Game 2; 28:04; Series tied 1–1			K/D/A: 30/14/100; Gold: 60.9K; Turrets: 9 Drakes: 4 Elder Dragons: 0 Barons: 1 Rift Heralds: 1 Voidgrubs: 3	
		K/D/A: 15/3/48; Gold: 73.7K; Turrets: 10; Drakes: 4 Elder Dragons: 0 Barons: 1 Rift Heralds: 1 Voidgrubs: 0	Game 3; 36:36; GEN leads series 2–1			K/D/A: 3/15/10; Gold: 59.8K; Turrets: 1 Drakes: 1 Elder Dragons: 0 Barons: 0 Rift Heralds: 0 Voidgrubs: 3	
		K/D/A: 10/17/28; Gold: 77.1K; Turrets: 4 Drakes: 4 Elder Dragons: 0 Barons: 3 Rift Heralds: 0 Voidgrubs: 1	Game 4; 45:51; Series tied 2–2			K/D/A: 17/10/54; Gold: 80.4K; Turrets: 7 Drakes: 3 Elder Dragons: 0 Barons: 0 Rift Heralds: 1 Voidgrubs: 2	
		K/D/A: 10/5/31; Gold: 59.3K; Turrets: 9 Drakes: 2 Elder Dragons: 0 Barons: 1 Rift Heralds: 0 Voidgrubs: 0	Game 5; 30:53; GEN wins series 3–2			K/D/A: 5/10/6; Gold: 52.8K; Turrets: 5 Drakes: 2 Elder Dragons: 0 Barons: 0 Rift Heralds: 1 Voidgrubs: 3	

Lower Round 3 Match 17	July 10	Bilibili Gaming	0	–	3	Anyone's Legend	Vancouver, Canada
	17:00 (UTC-8)						Pacific Coliseum
		K/D/A: 10/19/20; Gold: 63.5K; Turrets: 3 Drakes: 3 Elder Dragons: 0 Barons: 0 Rift Heralds: 1 Voidgrubs: 0	Game 1; 37:04; AL leads series 1–0			K/D/A: 19/10/51; Gold: 71.6K; Turrets: 8 Drakes: 2 Elder Dragons: 0 Barons: 1 Rift Heralds: 0 Voidgrubs: 3	
		K/D/A: 8/22/19; Gold: 47.9K; Turrets: 1 Drakes: 1 Elder Dragons: 0 Barons: 0 Rift Heralds: 1 Voidgrubs: 0	Game 2; 29:04; AL leads series 2–0			K/D/A: 22/8/54; Gold: 58.5K; Turrets: 7 Drakes: 3 Elder Dragons: 0 Barons: 1 Rift Heralds: 0 Voidgrubs: 3	
		K/D/A: 17/31/36; Gold: 79.4K; Turrets: 4 Drakes: 3 Elder Dragons: 0 Barons: 1 Rift Heralds: 1 Voidgrubs: 2	Game 3; 43:54; AL wins series 3–0			K/D/A: 31/17/66; Gold: 87.5K; Turrets: 11; Drakes: 3 Elder Dragons: 0 Barons: 2 Rift Heralds: 0 Voidgrubs: 1	

Lower Final; Match 18	July 11	T1	3	–	2	Anyone's Legend	Vancouver, Canada
	17:00 (UTC-8)						Pacific Coliseum
		K/D/A: 12/18/31; Gold: 47.9K; Turrets: 3 Drakes: 1 Elder Dragons: 0 Barons: 0 Rift Heralds: 0 Voidgrubs: 3	Game 1; 26:57; AL leads series 1–0			K/D/A: 18/12/46; Gold: 52.6K; Turrets: 7 Drakes: 3 Elder Dragons: 0 Barons: 0 Rift Heralds: 1 Voidgrubs: 0	
		K/D/A: 23/4/38; Gold: 64.4K; Turrets: 9 Drakes: 4 Elder Dragons: 1 Barons: 1 Rift Heralds: 1 Voidgrubs: 2	Game 2; 29:35; Series tied 1–1			K/D/A: 4/23/9; Gold: 50.2K; Turrets: 2 Drakes: 0 Elder Dragons: 0 Barons: 0 Rift Heralds: 0 Voidgrubs: 1	
		K/D/A: 8/23/20; Gold: 55.9K; Turrets: 2 Drakes: 2 Elder Dragons: 0 Barons: 0 Rift Heralds: 0 Voidgrubs: 0	Game 3; 31:37; AL leads series 2–1			K/D/A: 23/8/57; Gold: 63.6K; Turrets: 8 Drakes: 2 Elder Dragons: 0 Barons: 0 Rift Heralds: 1 Voidgrubs: 3	
		K/D/A: 10/9/27; Gold: 49.0K; Turrets: 7 Drakes: 4 Elder Dragons: 0 Barons: 0 Rift Heralds: 1 Voidgrubs: 1	Game 4; 26:41; Series tied 2–2			K/D/A: 9/10/18; Gold: 43.5K; Turrets: 1 Drakes: 0 Elder Dragons: 0 Barons: 0 Rift Heralds: 0 Voidgrubs: 2	
		K/D/A: 29/5/86; Gold: 60.7K; Turrets: 10; Drakes: 2 Elder Dragons: 0 Barons: 1 Rift Heralds: 1 Voidgrubs: 0	Game 5; 29:07; T1 wins series 3–2			K/D/A: 5/29/11; Gold: 46.7K; Turrets: 1 Drakes: 2 Elder Dragons: 0 Barons: 0 Rift Heralds: 0 Voidgrubs: 3	

Grand Final; Match 19	July 12	Gen.G	3	–	2	T1	Vancouver, Canada
	17:00 (UTC-8)						Pacific Coliseum
		K/D/A: 6/17/18; Gold: 55.4K; Turrets: 3 Drakes: 3 Elder Dragons: 0 Barons: 0 Rift Heralds: 0 Voidgrubs: 2	Game 1; 34:24; T1 leads series 1–0			K/D/A: 17/6/53; Gold: 67.7K; Turrets: 10; Drakes: 2 Elder Dragons: 0 Barons: 2 Rift Heralds: 1 Voidgrubs: 1	
		K/D/A: 24/10/59; Gold: 62.1K; Turrets: 8 Drakes: 4 Elder Dragons: 0 Barons: 1 Rift Heralds: 1 Voidgrubs: 1	Game 2; 30:29; Series tied 1–1			K/D/A: 10/24/26; Gold: 49.0K; Turrets: 1 Drakes: 1 Elder Dragons: 0 Barons: 0 Rift Heralds: 0 Voidgrubs: 2	
		K/D/A: 2/20/4; Gold: 41.6K; Turrets: 1 Drakes: 0 Elder Dragons: 0 Barons: 0 Rift Heralds: 0 Voidgrubs: 2	Game 3; 27:33; T1 leads series 2–1			K/D/A: 20/2/49; Gold: 55.1K; Turrets: 9 Drakes: 4 Elder Dragons: 0 Barons: 1 Rift Heralds: 1 Voidgrubs: 1	
		K/D/A: 13/3/36; Gold: 53.9K; Turrets: 8 Drakes: 2 Elder Dragons: 0 Barons: 1 Rift Heralds: 1 Voidgrubs: 1	Game 4; 26:57; Series tied 2–2			K/D/A: 3/13/5; Gold: 41.8K; Turrets: 2 Drakes: 2 Elder Dragons: 0 Barons: 0 Rift Heralds: 0 Voidgrubs: 2	
		K/D/A: 15/4/39; Gold: 72.9K; Turrets: 10; Drakes: 4 Elder Dragons: 0 Barons: 2 Rift Heralds: 1 Voidgrubs: 0	Game 5; 35:20; GEN wins series 3–2			K/D/A: 4/15/9; Gold: 58.5K; Turrets: 3 Drakes: 1 Elder Dragons: 0 Barons: 0 Rift Heralds: 0 Voidgrubs: 3	

== Ranking ==
A base prize pool of US$2,000,000 is offered for the tournament. The prize pool is spread among the teams as seen below:

Place	League	Team	Prize (%)	Prize (USD)
1st	LCK	Gen.G	25%	$500,000
2nd	LCK	T1	15%	$300,000
3rd	LPL	Anyone's Legend	12%	$240,000
4th	LPL	Bilibili Gaming	10%	$200,000
5th–6th	LTA	FlyQuest	8%	$160,000
5th–6th	LCP	CTBC Flying Oyster	8%	$160,000
7th–8th	LEC	Movistar KOI	6.5%	$130,000
7th–8th	LEC	G2 Esports	6.5%	$130,000
9th	LCP	GAM Esports	5%	$100,000
10th	LTA	FURIA	4%	$80,000

== Marketing ==
The tournament's official slogan, Ignite the Fire Within, was unveiled on June 17, 2025, alongside a format explainer video on YouTube.

== Global partners ==
- Amazon Web Services
- Esports World Cup
- Cisco
- Coinbase
- HyperX
- Mastercard
- Mercedes-Benz
- HP Omen
- Opera GX
- Oppo
- Red Bull
- Secretlab
- Verizon
