= Lucian Howard Cocke =

American mayor

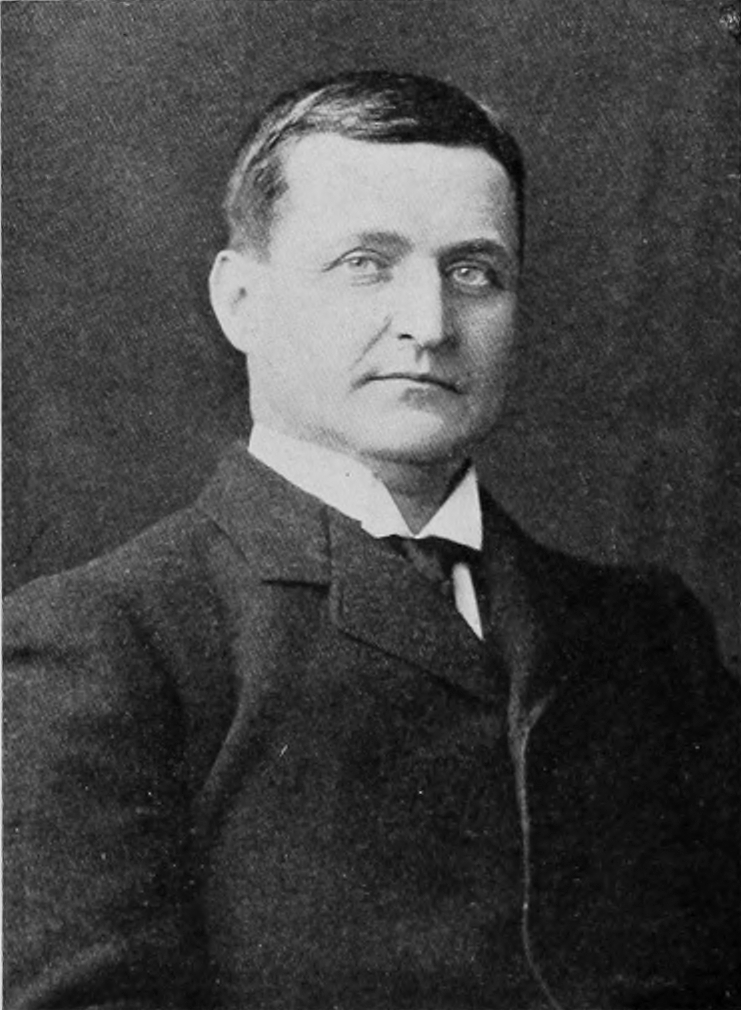
- Cocke in 1904 publication

6th Mayor of Roanoke, Virginia
- In office July 1, 1892 – June 30, 1894
- Preceded by: William G. Evans
- Succeeded by: Sturgis E. Jones

Personal details
- Born: Lucian Howard Cocke; March 27, 1858 Roanoke, Virginia, U.S.
- Died: November 14, 1927 (aged 69)
- Party: Democratic
- Spouses: Lelia Maria Smith Cocke (m. 1885; died 1899); Sarah Cobb Johnson (m. 1903)
- Children: 4
- Parent: Charles Lewis Cocke (father)

Lucian Howard Cocke (March 27, 1858 – November 14, 1927) was an American lawyer, politician, historian and university rector from Virginia.

== Life ==
Cocke was born on March 27, 1858, at Hollins College in Roanoke, Virginia where his father, Charles Lewis Cocke, was founder and president. His mother was Susanna Pleasants, a cousin of Virginia governor James Pleasants. His early education was under the tutelage of Hollins College professors. He eventually matriculated to Richmond College (now University of Richmond) but finished his bachelor's degree at Washington & Lee. He attended law school at the University of Virginia and upon graduating set up his own practice. In 1884, he joined into a partnership in Richmond forming the firm Penn & Cocke, after the retirement of Penn he formed a new partnership in Cocke & Glasgow. He was the first Democrat elected mayor of Roanoke, Virginia. From 1924 to 1928, he served as rector and trustee of his alma mater Washington & Lee. In private life, he was an avid author of works on the law, history and genealogy periodically contributing to the Virginia Historical Society and the William & Mary Quarterly.

== Family ==
Cocke married twice, first on September 17, 1885, to his distant cousin Lelia Maria Smith (1859–1899) a descendant of Robert "King" Carter and William Thornton. He and Smith had four children. After her death he married secondly in 1903, Sarah Cobb Johnson (1865–1944) a native of Alabama and the granddaughter of John Addison Cobb and descendant of Ambrose Cobbs and Thomas Reade Rootes. They had no children.

Ancestors of Lucian Howard Cocke

James Cocke
William Cocke
Mary Lewis
James Cocke
William New
Sarah New
Patience Russell
Charles Lewis Cocke
James Fox
Thomas Fox
Mildred Fenton
Elizabeth Fox
Lelia Lipscomb
Lucian Howard Cocke
John Pleasants
Joseph Pleasants
Susanna Woodson
Joseph Corbin Pleasants
Martin Burton
Elizabeth Jordan
Clementina Pleasants
Susanna Virginia Pleasants
Daniel Burton
Susanna Burton
Thomas Puryear
Mary Puryear
Margaret Bowles
