= Lelia Maria Smith Cocke =

American painter

Lelia Maria Smith Cocke (March 18, 1859 – April 5, 1899) was an American painter.

Born in Charlottesville, Virginia, Cocke was a descendant of Robert "King" Carter and William Thornton. She was the daughter of Francis H. Smith, a professor of natural philosophy at the University of Virginia, and his wife Mary Stuart Smith. She traveled to New York City to further her artistic education, taking lessons at the School of Design for Women at Cooper Union. In 1884 she returned to Virginia; the following year, in a ceremony at the University of Virginia, she married attorney Lucian Howard Cocke, a distant cousin, who went on to become the first Democrat elected mayor of Roanoke, Virginia. The couple had four children. Cocke was active as a portraitist until her death in Roanoke.

Cocke was relatively prolific despite her short career, producing, according to one estimate, over sixty portraits in all before her death. Of these, many are in the collections of the University of Virginia and Hollins College, of which latter her father-in-law Charles Lewis Cocke was founder and president.
