= Sarah Johnson Cocke =

American writer

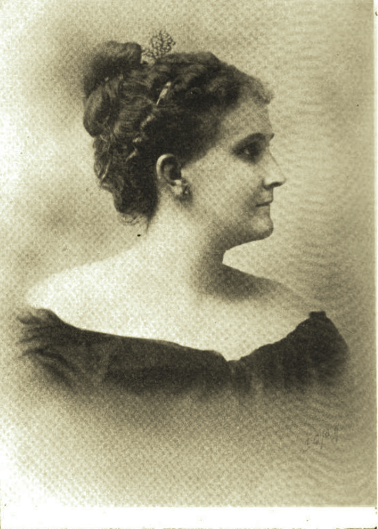
- Born: Sarah Cobb Johnson; February 7, 1865; Selma, Alabama, U.S.
- Died: January 20, 1944 (aged 78); Roanoke, Virginia, U.S.
- Education: Lucy Cobb Institute
- Occupations: writer; civic leader
- Spouses: Hugh Hagan (m. 1887; died 1898); Lucian Howard Cocke (m. 1903; died 1927)
- Children: 2 sons
- Relatives: Howell Cobb; Ambrose Cobbs; Thomas Reade Rootes Cobb
- Writing career
- Notable works: Old Mammy Tales from Dixie Land (1926), a re-issuing of Bypaths in Dixie (1911)

Signature
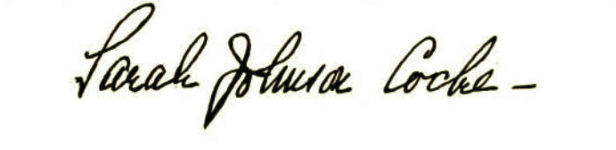

Sarah Johnson Cocke (née, Johnson; after first marriage, Hagan; after second marriage, Cocke; February 7, 1865 – January 20, 1944) was an American writer and civic leader. She was also active in several women's clubs. Cocke's works of Southern fiction include, Bypaths in Dixie, Master of the Hills, and Old Mammy Tales from Dixie Land. A memoir, A Woman of Distinction: From Hoopskirts to Airplanes, a Remembrance, was published posthumously.

== Early life and education ==
Sarah Cobb Johnson was born in Selma, Alabama, February 7, 1865, but was reared in Atlanta, Georgia. Both of her parents were members of distinguished Southern families. Her father was Dr. John Milton Johnson of Paducah, Kentucky, who served as president of Atlanta Academy of Medicine, as well as chair, department of physiology and pathological anatomy, Atlanta Medical College. Her mother was Mary Willis (nee Cobb) Erwin Johnson, of Athens, Georgia. Her mother was a daughter of John Addison and Sarah Robinson (Rootes) Cobb, and a sister of Howell Cobb, who served as Speaker of the House of Representatives and Secretary of the Treasury. John A. Cobb's mother was Mildred Lewis, a descendant in the sixth generation from Gen. Robert Lewis. In the Lewis line, Cocke was also a descendant of the Warner and Reade families. Through her grandmother, Sarah Robinson Rootes, she was a descendant of the Jacquelin family and also of the distinguished Virginia family of Cary, one of her ancestors in that line being Col. Miles Cary, who was a descendant of William Cary, mayor of Bristol, England, in 1492. She was also a descendant of Ambrose Cobbs and Thomas Reade Rootes Cobb.

Cocke was a graduate of Lucy Cobb Institute of Athens, Georgia.

== Career ==
During her residence in Atlanta, she was a member of the Daughters of the American Revolution (DAR), and served as vice-president general in 1890. She was a member of the Board of Directors and chair of ways and means of the woman's department of the Cotton States and International Exposition (Atlanta, 1895). She was also a charter member of the Atlanta Woman's Club.

Cocke was equally active after arriving in Roanoke, Virginia. She served as president of the Civic Betterment Club of Roanoke in 1904. She was a member of the National League of American Pen Women, the National Arts Club of New York City, the Woman's Club of Richmond, Virginia, Colonial Dames Club of Washington, D.C., the United Daughters of the Confederacy, and the Order of the Crown. She also served as chair of the Roanoke Committee of the Colonial Dames of America in the State of Virginia.

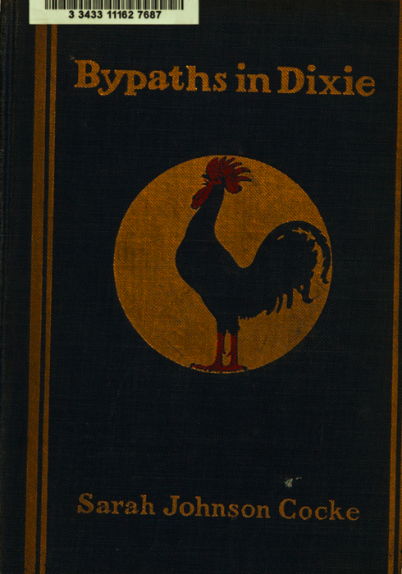
Bypaths in Dixie

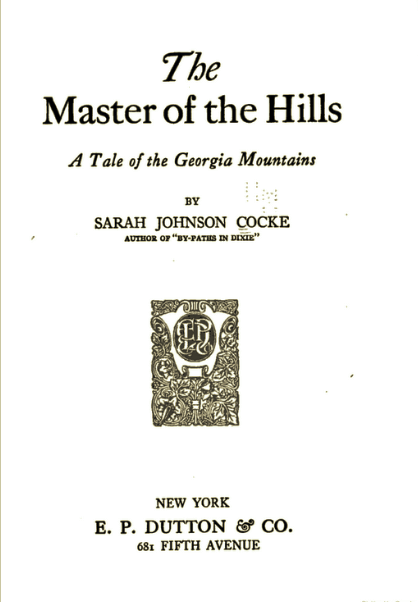
The Master of the Hills

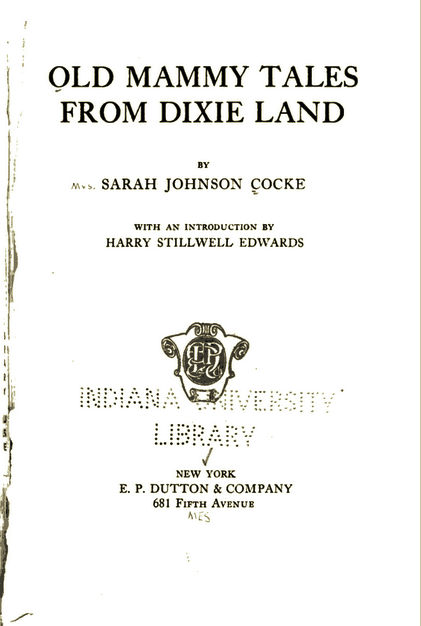
Old Mammy Tales from Dixie Land

Cocke wrote a great deal, including numerous magazine stories and frequent contributions to periodicals, including The Saturday Evening Post, Ladies' Home Journal, and The Country Gentleman. She wrote in African-American and "cracker" dialects, reproducing the wit and wisdom of the types which she portrayed. Cocke was the author "The Test of the Rooster and the Wash Pot" and "Phillis Sketches". She penned multiple books, including Bypaths in Dixie (New York : E. P. Dutton & Co., 1911) and Master of the Hills (New York : E. P. Dutton & Co., 1917). Old Mammy Tales from Dixie Land was a 1926 re-issuing of Bypaths in Dixie. Her memoir, A Woman of Distinction: From Hoopskirts to Airplanes, a Remembrance, were published posthumously in 2002.

== Personal life and legacy ==
On October 26, 1887, she married Dr. Hugh Hagan (1863-1898) of Atlanta. (Note: According to the History of Virginia, she married Hugh Hagan in 1888.) By that marriage, she had two sons, Hugh Johnson Hagan and Willis Cobb Hagan.

On October 30, 1903, she married Lucian Howard Cocke (1858–1927), of "Cockspur", Orchard Hill, Roanoke, Virginia. They had no children.

Following an extended illness, Sarah Johnson Cocke died at her Roanoke home, January 20, 1944. Burial was in the Cocke family cemetery at Hollins College (now Hollins University), her second husband having served as vice-president and part owner of the school.

== Awards and honors ==
Cocke's name is included on the Virginia Women's Monument.

== Selected works ==
- Bypaths in Dixie, 1911
- Master of the Hills, 1917
- Old Mammy Tales from Dixie Land, 1926
- A Woman of Distinction: From Hoopskirts to Airplanes, a Remembrance, 2002
