= Mary Stuart Smith =

American author and translator

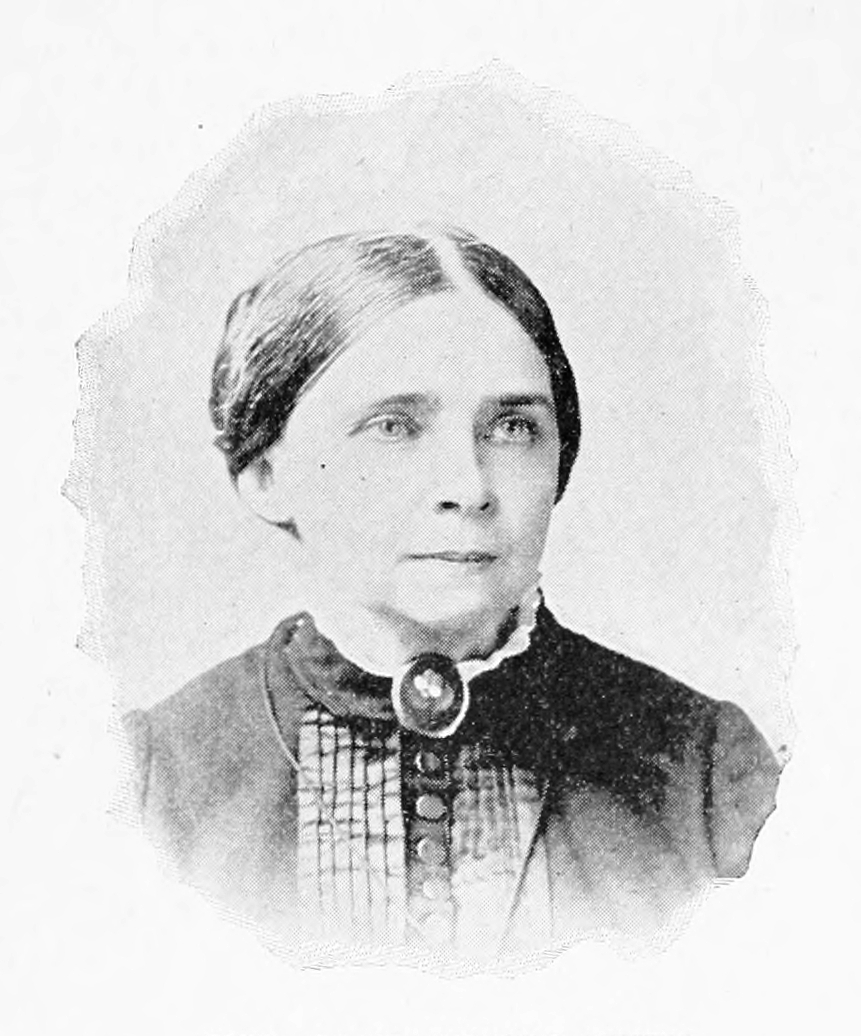
- At the Congress of Women 1893
- Born: Mary Stuart Harrison; February 10, 1834; Charlottesville, Virginia, US
- Died: December 8, 1917 (aged 83)
- Resting place: University of Virginia Cemetery
- Occupations: Author and translator
- Spouse: Prof. Francis H. Smith
- Children: Twelve–see text

Signature
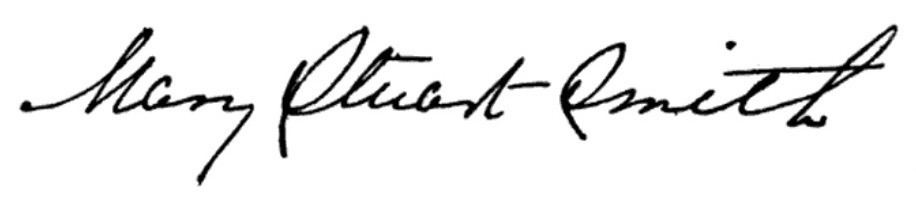

Mary Stuart Harrison Smith (February 10, 1834 – December 8, 1917) was an American writer, translator, and women's advocate. Her Virginia Cookery Book (1885) is one of the country's early modern cookbooks. In addition to other original works, she published over fifty translated compositions, primarily from the German to English. She was a descendant of the Harrison family of Virginia, and also authored numerous book reviews for various periodicals.

In 1893, Smith attended and spoke on behalf of Virginia women at the Chicago World's Congress, which was designed to highlight women's rights. In 1895 she was among the women invited by the Virginia governor to represent the commonwealth's female workers at the Board of Women's convention at the International Exposition in Atlanta.

Smith is prominently memorialized at the University of Virginia chapel—she was likely a participant in the funding and creation of the chapel as a lifelong resident of the campus.

== Early life and family ==
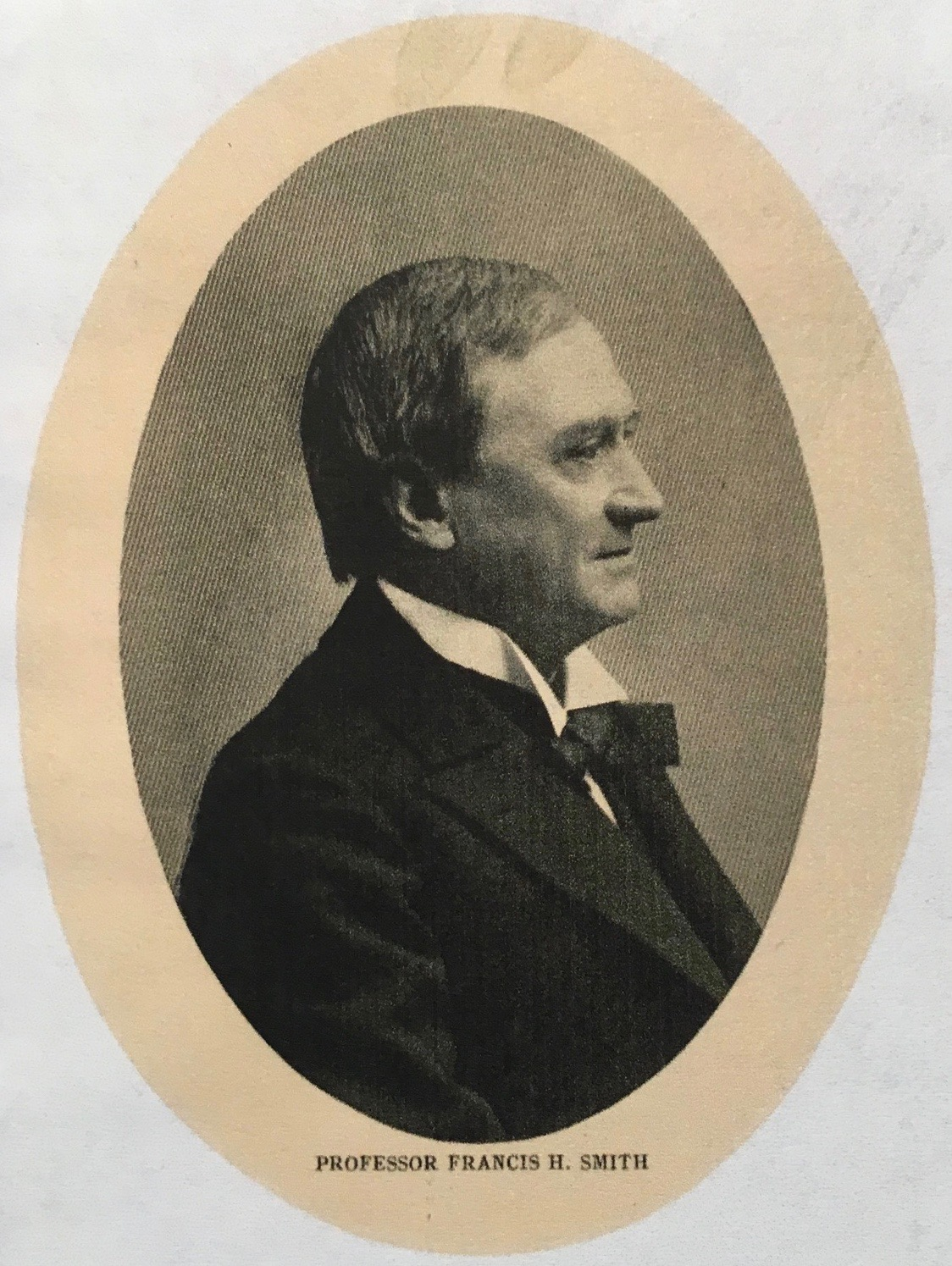
Smith's husband, Francis H. Smith, U. Va. Prof. of Natural Philosophy (Note: The university's 1906 yearbook includes this photo, and a dedication to Prof. Smith, which reads, "To Francis H. Smith, a true type of southern chivalry who, for fifty-three years, has devoted his energies in loving service to our university, in recognition of the love and admiration he has won from students and colleagues alike by his kindness of heart, gentleness of manner, and thoughtful consideration at all times, we respectfully dedicate this, the nineteenth volume of "Corks and Curls.")

Smith was born at the University of Virginia, in Charlottesville, on February 10, 1834. She was the second child of Professor Gessner Harrison and wife Eliza Lewis Carter Tucker. Professor Harrison was the son of Dr. Peachy Harrison and Mary (née Stuart). Dr. Harrison was a physician and politician in Harrisonburg, which was founded by his grandfather, Daniel Harrison. Eliza Tucker was the daughter of Prof. George Tucker and Maria Ball Carter.

Smith’s education was provided by family and private tutors—her grandfather and father taught philosophy and ancient languages, respectively. She studied Latin, German, French, Italian, and Greek, and she demonstrated a proclivity for poetry beginning at age 13.

On July 31, 1853, she married Francis H. Smith (1829–1928), son of Daniel Grove Smith and Eleanor Buckey. (Note: Francis Smith was born in Leesburg, Va., attended Leesburg Academy, graduated Phi Beta Kappa from Wesleyan College, and later received an M.A. degree at Univ. of Va.. During the Civil War he served as Confederate Commissioner of Weights and Measures.) He was a Professor and Faculty Chairman at the university and they made their 69-year residence on the Lawn in Pavilion V there.

The Smiths had eight children in addition to four who died in infancy: (Note: The author of Settlers by the Long Grey Trail is related; the work, which has an extensive bibliography, is widely used as a reliable source for vital statistics and genealogy.)

- Eliza Lewis Carter—died 1880; married William W. Walker
- Eleanor Annabel—married 1st, Fielding Miles, married 2nd, Dr. Charles W. Kent
- Lelia Maria—portraitist; married Lucien Cocke
- Gessner Harrison—1861–1892
- George Tucker, M.D.—Rear Admiral, U.S.N; died 1939
- Mary Stuart—died 1900
- Eleanor Rosalie—1870–1956; married Isaac Carrington Harrison, M.D. (Note: Genealogy at hand shows Rosalie and Carrington Harrison shared lineal Harrison ancestors 8 generations distant.)
- James Duncan—1879–1934; portraitist

== Career ==
=== Original works ===
After the American Civil War, Smith's nascent interest in writing began to flourish with her Art of Housekeeping in 1878, which first appeared as a series of papers written for the New York Fashion Bazar. Her first original book Heirs of the Kingdom was published in Nashville in 1880, for which a prize of $300 was awarded by a select committee. (Note: Using the CPI, the 1880 prize of $300 has a cash equivalent in 2020 of about $7,600.)

There is danger that the composition of many an excellent dish may become forgotten lore.

— Virginia Cookery Book (1885)

Smith's Virginia Cookery Book was one of the early modern efforts made of that genre in America, in 1885. In the preface, Smith provided her principal motivation for the book, as one of “expediency” in light of “old domestic institutions being done away with.” She then gave reverence to her forebears in cookery, saying, “Enough it will be for the Virginia Cookery Book to take its place on the housekeeper’s pantry-shelf alongside the similar works of Miss Leslie, Marion Harland, Mrs. Henderson, and Mrs. Hale.” Smith further emphasized the role of her book as “a memento of the past, as well as a help in the present,” extolling Mary Randolph‘s Virginia Housewife (1824), of which there was then no authorized edition extant. Smith then reproduced the introduction to Randolph's book, which was written for that lady by Smith's grandfather, Professor Tucker.

Smith's Lang Syne, or the Wards of Mt. Vernon was published on the occasion of the Washington Centennial, held in New York in April 1887. Her series of Letters from a Lady in New York was published (date unknown) in the Religious Herald.

=== Translations ===
Critics thought Smith had a special gift for translating German poetry, including her Chidhe in the Overland Monthly. She authored many translations for leading periodicals and publishing houses. From Ernst Werner, she translated A Hero of the Pen, Hermann, Good Luck, What the Spring Brought, St. Michael, A Judgment of God, and Beacon Lights. Her translations from other German writers were Lieschen, The Fairy of the Alps, The Bailiff's Maid, Gold Elsie, Old Ma'amselle's Secret, The Owl House, The Lady With the Rubies, Serapis, The Bride of the Nile, and Lace by Paul Lindau, and others. She also translated from the French, The Salon of Mine and Necker.

Her work includes books for children, also translations from the German, such as The Canary Bird and Other Stories and Jack the Breton Boy. Other children's works were adaptations from the French, including How Lillie Spent Her Day and Little May and Her Lost A.

=== Review articles ===
Some of Smith's articles were in the form of reviews for the Southern Review, the Southern Methodist Quarterly, and the Church Review. Among her best review articles were Askaros Kassis Karis, Robert Emmet, Queen Louisa of Prussia, John of Barneveldt, What the Swallows Sang, The Women of the Revolution, The Women of the Southern Confederacy, Madame de Stael and Her Parents, The Necker Family, Madam Recamier, Mary and Martha Washington, and The Virginia Gentlewoman of the Olden Time.

Smith also made numerous contributions of practical articles in Harper's Bazar, as well as others in the American Agriculturist, Good Housekeeping, and other periodicals.

=== Advocacy for women ===
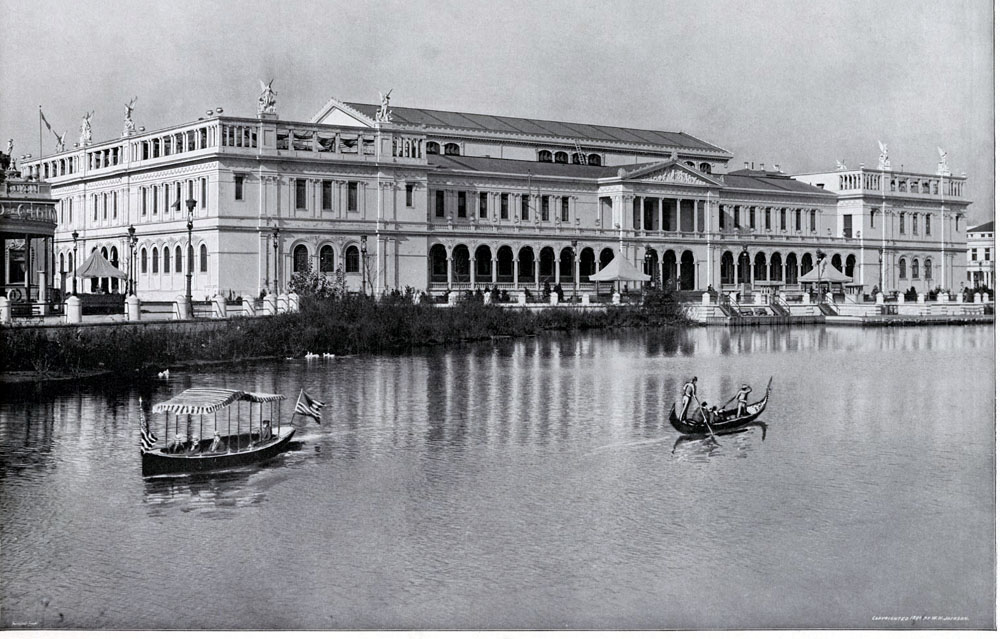
The Women's Building at the Chicago World's Fair—site of Smith's speech

Smith attended the Congress of Representative Women held at the Chicago World's Fair in 1893. The Congress focused on the political, social, and technical agendas of women, including suffrage, and was attended by activists including Jane Addams, Bertha Palmer, Lucy Stone, and Susan B. Anthony. Smith spoke on "The Virginia Woman of Today" and included an anecdote reflecting the admitted, but officially unacknowledged, ability of Virginia women in the fine arts:

"Mr. Lewis Ginter, one of Richmond's wealthiest citizens, sent an order to New York for two watercolor drawings...and the art dealer there sent him two that were executed by Miss Williams of Mr. Ginter's own city. But, you observe, the New York seal was required upon this Southern work before its value was acknowledged at home. The failure to recognize and cherish the genius of her own artists and literary workers is one of the blots on Virginia's escutcheon. May it be the happy portion of the present generation to wipe out this reproach." (Note: Lewis Ginter (1824–1897) was a renowned philanthropist in Richmond, Va.)

The Ideal Wife (lyrics by M.S. Smith)
Within doors greet
The wife discreet,
The mother fair,
And full of care.
She wisely guides,
And firmly chides.
Her sweet control
Imbues the whole.

Her daughter instructing, the boys she commands,
And moves, without ceasing, her diligent hands.
Economy and order more
Increase the wealth laid up in store.
She fills with stuffs, sweet scented chests,
Her busy spinning wheel ne'er rests:
And heaps the well scoured presses full
Of snowy linen, glistening wool.
The good and might she mingleth ever,
And resteth never.

Smith in her speech also reviewed the remarkable efforts of Dr. Orianna Moon as an example of indomitable feminine spirit—Dr. Moon of Scottsville, Virginia, became a pioneer for women seeking a career as a medical doctor. Smith concluded her remarks as follows:

“Sisters of other states! Few experiences has the writer found more thrilling than to converse at this Congress with women of other lands and different training. ...Let the last word now spoken concerning Virginia women be a greeting on their part of warm good-will to those who preside over these Congresses, and to the genial, liberal women assembled here from all parts of the world.”

The World’s Fair ended abruptly with the tragic assassination of Chicago's Mayor, and Smith's distant cousin, Carter Harrison, Sr.

In 1895 Smith was in a group commissioned by Virginia Governor Charles T. O’Ferrall to represent the Virginia Dept. of Women Workers at the Board of Women of the Cotton States International Exposition in Atlanta. The Virginia legislature was not then in session and, there being no funds available for the journey and stay in Atlanta, the women's group resolved to raise the funds by individually creating patriotic song lyrics for compilation and sale. Smith therefore served as editor in producing From Virginia to Georgia, A Tribute in Song by Virginia Women, that included three entries of her own, one of which, The Ideal Wife, is at margin.

== University of Virginia memorial ==
The University of Virginia Christian community remembers Smith positively. A stained glass window 4.0 m (13 ft) high at the University Chapel is dedicated to her memory. Smith's connection with the chapel is not otherwise documented. Record of the original funding and construction of the chapel, which coincide with Smith's lifelong campus residency, indicates the formation in 1883 of the Ladies Chapel Aid Society, prior to the laying of the chapel's cornerstone in 1885 and completion in 1889. The chapel's exhibit at the university's library indicates, "A chapel was finally built on the grounds in the 1880s after a successful campaign led by women dedicated to the spiritual needs of the University community." Library records further show total funds raised were about $36,000.

Smith is interred in the university cemetery with her husband.

== Gallery–University of Virginia Chapel ==
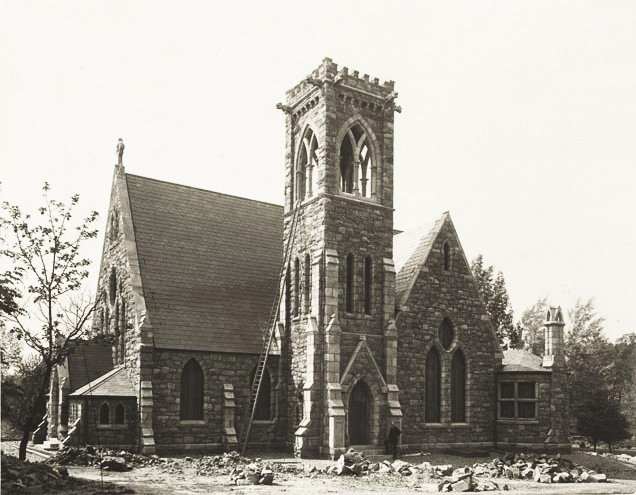
Univ. of Virginia Chapel in 1889, near the end of construction

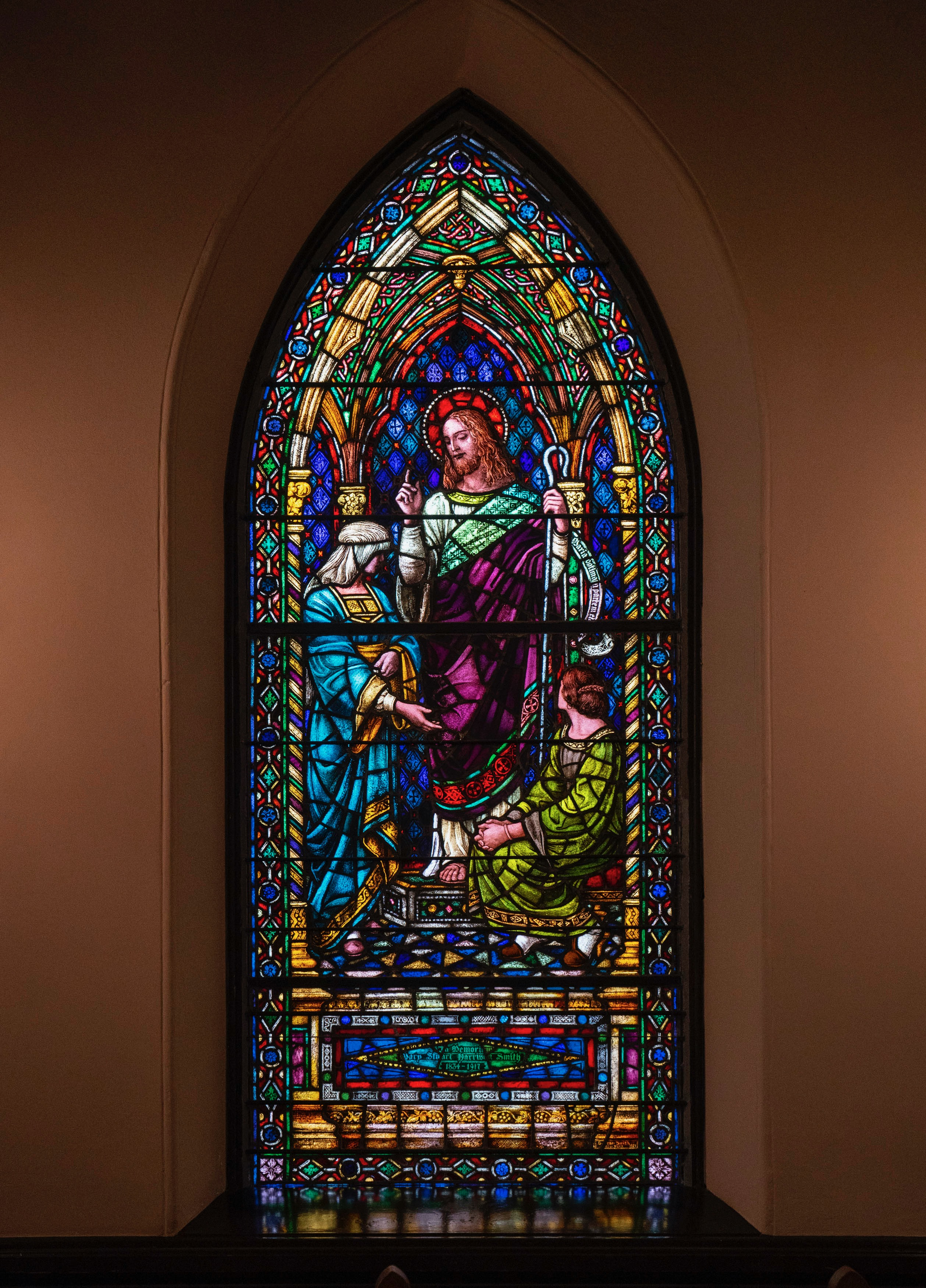
Chapel window dedicated to Mary Stuart Harrison Smith

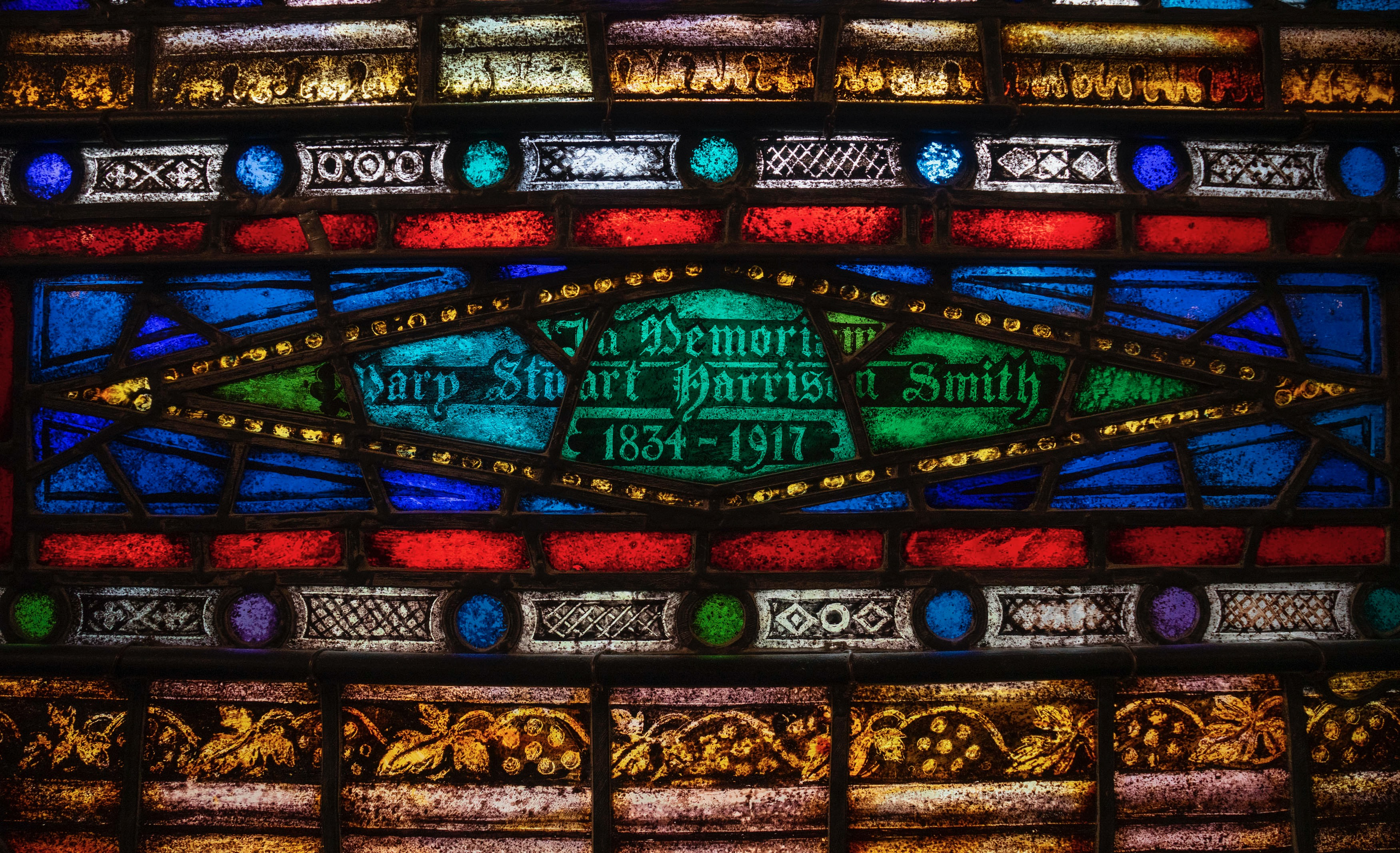
Mary Stuart Harrison Smith Chapel window–dedication panel

== Works ==
- Smith, Mary Stuart (1878). The Art of Housekeeping. New York: Munro Publ.
- Smith, Mary Stuart (1880). Heirs of the Kingdom. Nashville: Southern Methodist Publ. House.
- Smith, Mary Stuart (1885). Virginia Cookery Book. New York: Harper and Bros.
- Smith, Mary Stuart (1893). Mary Mark Ockerbloom (ed.). The Congress of Women: The Virginia Woman Today (Speech). New York: T. Nelson and Sons.
- Smith, Mary Stuart, ed. (1895). From Virginia to Georgia, A Tribute in Song by Virginia Women. Richmond: B. F. Johnson.
