= Norvell P. Cobb =

Confederate States Army officer

Norvell Pleasants Cobb
- Born: June 28, 1824; Buckingham County, Virginia
- Died: October 8, 1879 (aged 55); Rockbridge County, Virginia
- Military career
- Allegiance: Confederate States of America
- Branch: Confederate States Army
- Service years: 1861–1865
- Rank: Colonel, CSA
- Commands: 44th Virginia Infantry; 25th Virginia Infantry
- Conflicts: American Civil War
- Other work: Hotelier, Insurance Broker

Norvell P. Cobb (June 18, 1824 – October 8, 1879) was an American Civil War officer, banker and hotelier.

== Early life ==
Norvell Cobb was born in Buckingham County, Virginia in 1824 to William Cobb(s) and Sarah 'Sallie' Ann Puryear. He came from a prominent landed and slave-holding family seated in the Buckingham/Albemarle area of Virginia since the early to mid-18th century. Prior to the Civil War, Cobb and his brothers helped develop the town of Maysville (later renamed Buckingham) where he co-founded the Maysville Savings Bank and built the first hotel. Cobb expanded his enterprises by acquiring the Randolph House in Farmville, Virginia. Over time Cobb and his brothers took an ever more active role in politics and daily operation of life in Buckingham and Prince Edward Counties, Virginia. Cobb and his elder brother Watson Benning Cobb oversaw the construction of major roads, delivery of mail, organization of the county finances and wholesale auction and distribution of tobacco from planters in the region. The brothers were also involved in local government including the organization of a slave monitoring system in the post-Nat Turner period. The Cobb family secured a number of licenses and permits to control the distribution of mail into the Southside of Virginia from the Federal government starting in the late-1840s. Cobb's brother Reuben Puryear Cobb served as postmaster of Buckingham County in the years leading up to the Civil War and his niece Mary Ann Carter served as Post Mistress of Prince Edward County, Virginia in the 1890s.

== Civil War ==
In June 1861 Cobb was commissioned a Captain in the 44th Virginia Infantry, forming the Randolph Guards. In May 1862 he was promoted to Major and within a year promoted to Colonel. He fought in many of the major battles of the Virginia campaign including Fredericksburg, Spotsylvania Court House, The Wilderness, Antietam and Gettysburg. He was wounded at Gettysburg and Chancellorsville where he was also taken prisoner. He was released in a prisoner exchanged and rejoined his regiment following Gen. Lee all the way to Appomattox Court House. In a letter to her brother in Philadelphia, Mrs. Cobb wrote that her home in Farmville had been occupied by the Northern Army and that all that could be taken had. Cobb suffered great financial loss during the war including the destruction and theft of property as well as the death of at least one child.

== Post-war ==
Cobb was forced to declare bankruptcy twice and periodically took up employment as an insurance salesman. In 1872 he manage to procure enough backing to open the 'American Hotel' in Richmond. His hotel venture failed and he moved through a succession of hotel management positions around Virginia and Washington. Cobb was last engaged at the Rockbridge Alum Springs Grand Hotel, in Rockbridge County, Virginia where he was accidentally shot and killed in a hunting accident in 1879. Following Cobb's death, his son Norvell Hendrix Cobb took a position within the U.S. Signal Corps but eventually left to open 'Cobbs Hotel' in Washington, D.C., with his mother. The hotel survived into the early twentieth century though was sold by the Jones family upon the premature death of the younger Cobb in the 1890s.

== Family ==
Norvell Cobb married at Philadelphia, Pennsylvania in 1848 Emmeline Marguerite "Emma" Howell, the daughter of Amos Howell and granddaughter of Amos Howell of Trenton who is reported to have owned the boats used to ferry Washington across the Delaware. They had six children only three of whom lived to adulthood, a one son and two daughters who died unmarried. Col. Cobb was himself a direct descendant of a number of early prominent colonist including Ambrose Cobbs, Edward Stratton, Richard Cocke of Bremo and John Pleasants, as well as the interpreter William Woodward by his daughter Martha who married three times – to William Bigger, Gideon Macon and Nathaniel West (captain). Martha Woodward was the direct ancestor of Martha Washington her Custis and Lee (Robert E. Lee) descendants, Letitia Christian Tyler wife of John Tyler and by marriage to Declaration of Independence signer Richard Henry Lee . Cobb was through his grandfather a first cousin once removed from General Henry L. Benning as well as Howell Cobb and Thomas Reade Rootes Cobb.
