= 44th Virginia Infantry Regiment =

- Flag of Virginia, 1861
- Active: June 1861 – April 1865
- Disbanded: April 1865
- Country: Confederacy
- Allegiance: Confederate States of America
- Branch: Confederate States Army
- Type: Infantry
- Engagements: American Civil War: Battle of Rich Mountain; Battle of Cheat Mountain; Jackson's Valley Campaign; Seven Days' Battles; Second Battle of Bull Run; Battle of Antietam; Battle of Fredericksburg; Battle of Chancellorsville; Battle of Gettysburg; Battle of Cold Harbor; Siege of Petersburg; Valley Campaigns of 1864; Appomattox Campaign

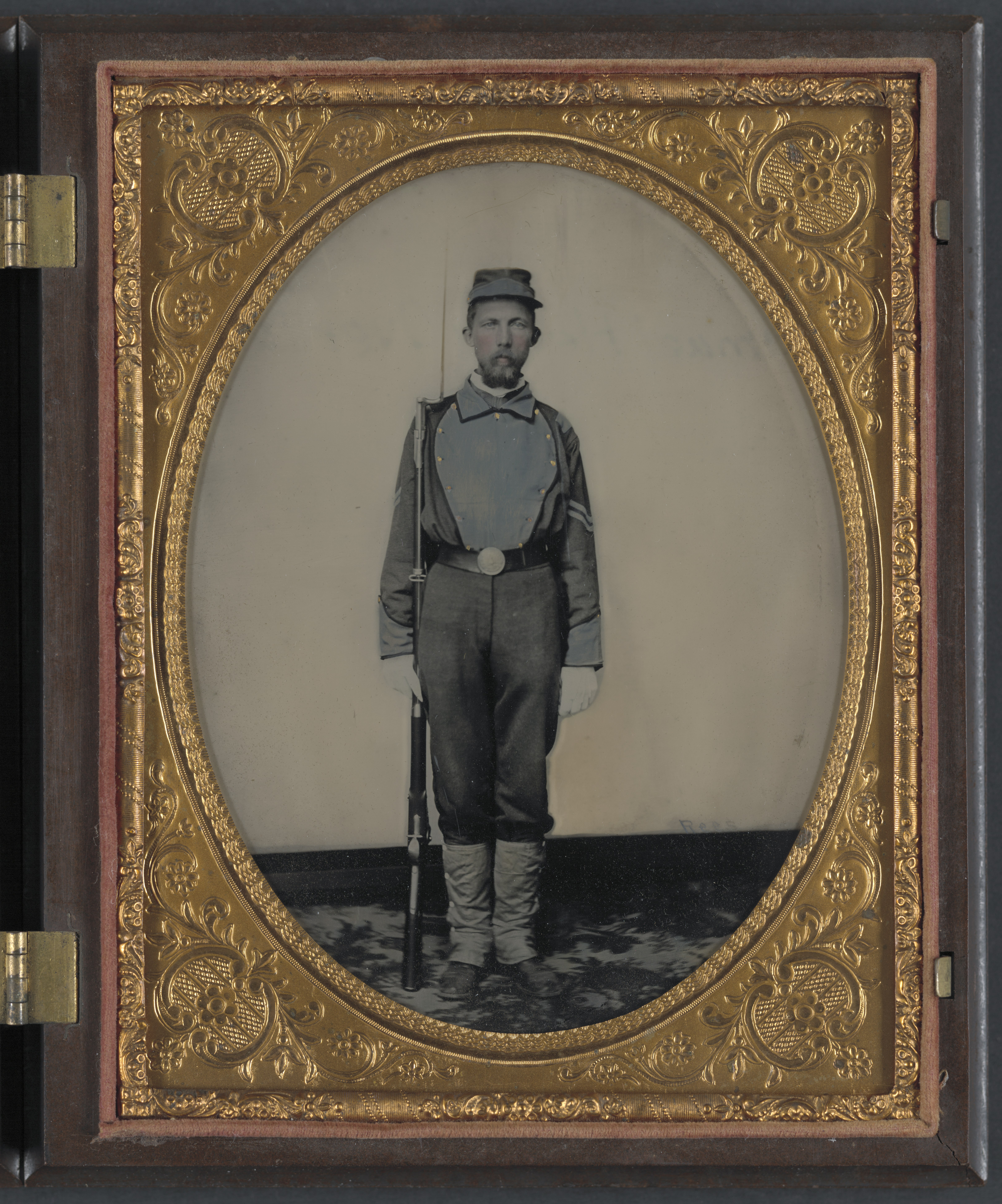
Corporal Samuel H. Overton of A Company, 44th Virginia Infantry Regiment

The 44th Virginia Infantry Regiment was an infantry regiment raised in Virginia for service in the Confederate States Army during the American Civil War. It fought mostly with the Army of Northern Virginia.

The 44th Virginia was organized in June 1861, with men from Richmond and Farmville, and Appomattox, Buckingham, Louisa, Goochland, Amelia, Fluvanna, and Hanover counties.

The unit fought at Rich Mountain, in Lee's Cheat Mountain Campaign, and was active in Jackson's Valley operations. During March, 1862, it was reduced to nine companies as Company A was transferred to the artillery. The 44th served in General Early's, J.R. Jones', and W. Terry's Brigade, Army of Northern Virginia. It was involved in many engagements from the Seven Days' Battles to Cold Harbor, then continued the fight with Early in the Shenandoah Valley and around Appomattox.

The regiment reported 5 wounded at Greenbrier River, had 2 killed and 17 wounded at McDowell, and lost 15 killed and 38 wounded at Cross Keys and Port Republic. It sustained 15 casualties at Fredericksburg and 71 at Chancellorsville, and of the 227 engaged at Gettysburg more than twenty percent were disabled. Only 1 officer and 12 men surrendered in April, 1865.

The field officers were Colonels Norvell Cobb and William C. Scott; Lieutenant Colonels Thomas R. Buckner, James L. Hubard, A.C. Jones; and Major David W. Anderson.

== See also ==
- List of Virginia Civil War units
