= William A. Hocker =

American judge (1844–1918)

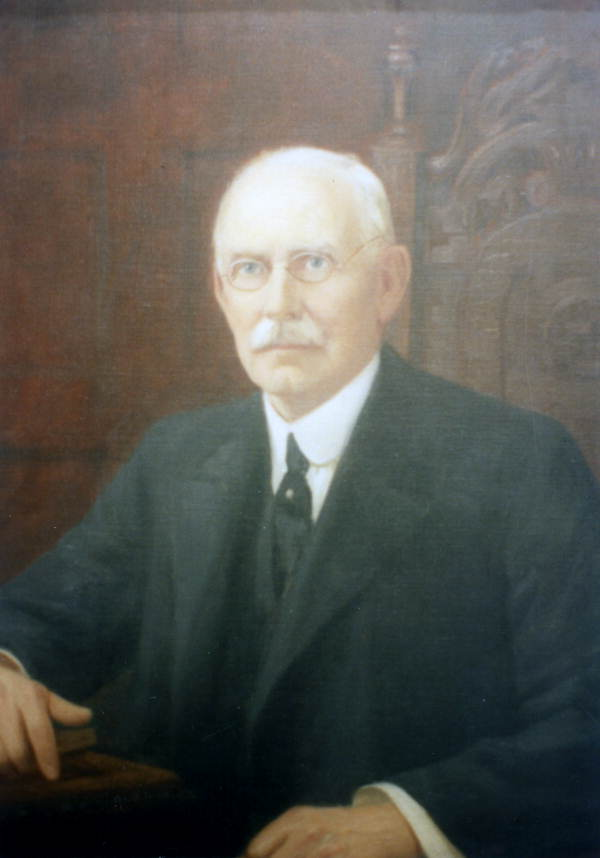
Painted portrait of Florida's 32nd Supreme Court Justice William A. Hocker (circa 1903)

William Adams Hocker (December 5, 1844 – July 17, 1918) was a justice of the Florida Supreme Court from January 6, 1903, to January 5, 1915.

Born in Buckingham County, Virginia, to William Hocker and Susan Mildred Lewis, Hocker was descended from early Virginia settler Ambrose Cobbs. He served in Fitzhugh Lee's cavalry during the American Civil War, and his company was General Lee's bodyguard at Appomattox.

Hocker studied law at the University of Virginia, and in November 1868, he married Gertrude Venable and settled near Leesburg, Florida, in 1874. In 1891, he served in the Florida House of Representatives, and as a state's attorney. He served as a delegate to the Florida Constitutional Convention of 1885. He moved to Ocala in 1892, where he became circuit judge for the fifth circuit from 1893 to 1901, when the Florida Legislature addressed the court's increasing workload "by authorizing the court to appoint three attorneys to act as commissioners and assist the court in performing its duties", with Hocker being appointed along with James F. Glen and Evelyn C. Maxwell. These appointments lasted until 1902, at which time Hocker was elected to a seat on the Florida Supreme Court vacated by the retirement of Chief Justice Milton H. Mabry. Hocker occupied the position for twelve years.

In 1909 he was married the second time to Mattie N. Glover of Roanoke, Virginia. He retired from the court in 1915 due to failing health.

Hocker died in Jacksonville, where he had been taken to a sanitarium for an operation. He was survived by his second wife, and three of his four children.

Political offices
Preceded by Milton H. Mabry	Justice of the Florida Supreme Court; 1903–1915	Succeeded by William H. Ellis
