= Ambrose Cobbs =

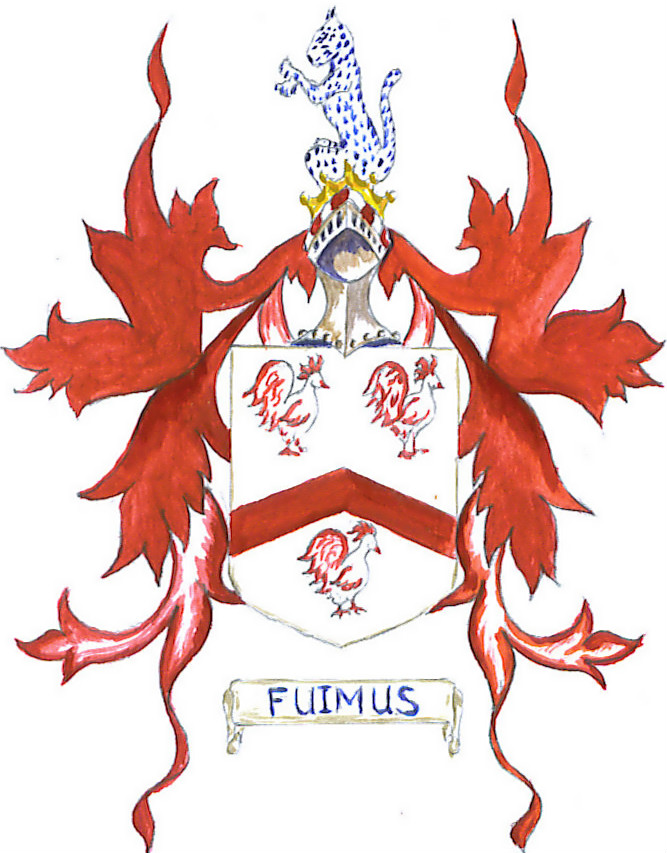
- Coat-of-Arms of Cobbs of Kent
- Born: Ambrose Cobbs; 1603; Kent, England
- Died: 1655 (aged 51–52); Henrico (now Chesterfield) County, Virginia
- Occupations: Colonist, Planter

Ambrose Cobbs (1603 – c. 1655) was an early Virginia colonist and planter who established the long lasting social and political Cobb dynasty in the southern states.

== Life ==
Ambrose Cobbs was born in 1603 in Kent, England. He was the son of Ambrose Cobbs and Angelica Hunt, the sister of Robert Hunt, chaplain of the first permanent English settlement at Jamestown in 1607. Cobbs married before 1627, Ann White with whom he had at least six known children. In 1633, Cobbs and his wife sold their property in Kent in preparation for their immigration to Virginia. It is believed that he, his wife Ann, children Robert and Margaret arrived in Virginia in 1635. In 1639 Cobbs patented 350 acres at the mouth of the Appomattox River as a headright for have paid for the immigration of his family along with Hugh Barker, Thomas Barker and Thomas Harding.

Two of the Ambrose Cobbs children, Ambrose and Jane were born and died in Kent before his immigration. He and his wife Ann bore another two children, sons Ambrose (the younger) and Thomas after their arrival in Virginia. Cobbs died about late 1655 or within the first few days of 1656, his will was probated January 15, 1656. His home-site was later sold to the Bolling family who used the name "Cobbs Hall" for their estate.

== Children ==
- Robert Cobbs: The eldest surviving of Ambrose Cobbs, he was born in Kent in 1627. He was executor of his father estate and later removed to York County, Virginia just outside present-day Williamsburg. He is believed to have married Elizabeth Thorpe a relation of Maj. Otho Thorpe. He served as a vestryman of Bruton Parish Church in Williamsburg from 1674 to 1683 during the period in which the first brick church was built on the present site.
- Margaret Cobbs: The second surviving child of Ambrose Cobbs, she was born in Kent in 1631 and was listed in her father's land patent. Her later fate is unknown.
- Ambrose Cobbs: The second eldest surviving son of Ambrose Cobbs born after 1635 in Virginia. He resided in York County, Virginia and married leaving two children, a son and daughter. His widow later remarried George Glasscock.
- Thomas Cobbs: The youngest surviving child of Ambrose Cobbs was born in Virginia. He died unmarried and without issue in York County, Virginia.

== Georgia Cobb family ==
A number of Ambrose Cobbs descendants migrated to Georgia in the later part of the 18th century founding a powerful dynasty which has continued to hold social and political influence into the 21st century. This prominent Georgia branch of the Cobbs family was founded by Thomas 'Old Tom' Cobbs and John Addison Cobbs, great-great grandsons of Ambrose through his son Robert. The two men would eventually drop the 'S' from their surname as would all their descendants by the Civil War. Cobb County, Georgia was named for his descendant Thomas Willis Cobb, grandson of Thomas 'Old Tom' Cobbs

== Descendants and relations of Ambrose Cobbs ==
The following is a list of direct and collateral descendants of Ambrose Cobbs .

1. Daniel W. Abercrombie, III (U.S. Naval Commander)
2. William Yates Atkinson (55th Governor of Georgia) married Susan Cobb Milton
3. Nathan Franklin Barrett (American landscape architect) married Lucy Mildred Lampkin
4. Augustus Harrison Benning (Atlanta developer and builder of Atlanta's 'Flatiron building')
5. Henry L. Benning (Confederate officer, Lawyer, Politician and Jurist)
6. Thomas Cobb Benning (Methodist minister and founding member of Emory University)
7. Howard Bucknell, III (U.S. Naval Captain)
8. John Harllee Carmichael (U.S. Naval Captain)
9. Walter Eli Clark (1st Governor of the Alaska Territory) married Lucy Harrison Norvell.
10. Howell Cobb (born 1772) (Politician)
11. Howell Cobb (Secretary of the Treasury, 40th Governor of Georgia, Provincial head of the C.S.A)
12. James E. Cobb (U.S. Representative from Alabama)
13. Joseph Beckham Cobb (Antebellum author, Planter and Mississippi legislator)
14. Mary E. Cobb (Inventor of the modern manicure)
15. Norvell P. Cobb (Confederate Colonel of the 44th Virginia)
16. Rufus W. Cobb (25th Governor of Alabama)
17. Sarah Alberta Addison Alexina Telfair Cobb (Socialite and Heiress presumptive)
18. Thomas Moon Cobb (Confederate Lieutenant of the 13th Virginia)
19. Thomas Reade Rootes Cobb (Author of the Confederate Constitution, Civil War Officer)
20. Thomas W. Cobb (U. S. Representative and Senator from Georgia) Cobb County, Georgia is named in his honor.
21. Merian C. Cooper (Film director, Producer, Screenwriter and adventurer) best known for 'King Kong'
22. Russell Grace D'Oench, Jr. (Shipping heir and Newspaper owner)
23. Peter D'Oench (Television news reporter)
24. Russell Grace D'Oench (Shipping heir)
25. Margaret Eliott of Redheugh (Scottish Aristocrat and Landowner)
26. Sir Gilbert Eliott, 10th Baronet, of Stobs (Scottish Aristocrat and Landowner) married Dora Adams Hopkins
27. Sir Arthur Eliott, 11th Baronet, of Stobs (Scottish Aristocrat and Landowner)
28. Theodore Gordon Ellyson (First Naval aviator) married Helen Mildred Lewis Glenn.
29. John Glenn (Mayor of Atlanta)
30. Luther Glenn (Confederate officer, lawyer, Mayor of Atlanta). married Mildred Lewis Cobb.
31. Henry W. Grady (Georgia journalist and orator)
32. John Grant (Antebellum railroad baron and reconstruction era developer) married Martha Cobb Jackson
33. Sarah Frances Grant (Socialite and Philanthropist)
34. John W. Grant (Atlanta merchant and owner of the Kimball House)
35. Burton Harrison (Lawyer, politician and private secretary of Jefferson Davis)
36. Constance Cary Harrison (Writer) married Burton Harrison
37. Fairfax Harrison (Railroad executive, lawyer, historian, writer)
38. Francis Burton Harrison (Governor-General of the Philippines and U.S. Representative from New York).
39. Oliver Markham Healey (Atlanta developer)
40. Lucas Hedges (actor)
41. Peter Hedges (Writer, Director)
42. William A. Hocker (Florida Jurist) married Mattie Norvell Glover.
43. Sarah Johnson Cocke (Writer and civic leader)
44. Dorothy Jordan (Film actress) wife of Merian C. Cooper
45. Robert F. Kennedy (Politician, US Attorney General)
46. Lucian Lamar Knight (Georgia historian and newspaper editor)
47. Kathryn Denise Rucker Krepp (Chief Counsel, U.S. Maritime Administration)
48. Jefferson Mirabeau Lamar (Confederate officer) married Mary Athena Lamar.
49. John Lawrence Marye, Jr. (Conservative politician)
50. P. Thornton Marye (Georgia architect and preservationist)
51. John Milton (Florida politician) (5th Governor of Florida) married Susan Amanda Cobb.
52. Susan Cobb Milton (Suffragette, educator, entrepreneur, first female postmistress in Georgia, First Lady of Georgia)
53. Benning Betts Moore (Georgia lawyer and jurist)
54. Anton Papich (Washington D.C. photographer)
55. William Hayes Pope (New Mexico Jurist) married May Nisbet Hull
56. Mildred Lewis Rutherford (Educator, Writer and History Revisionist)
57. Laura Turner Seydel (Environmental Activist) married to Rurtherford Seydel.
58. Paul B. Seydel (Belgian-American chemical manufacturer)
59. Mildred Seydell (journalist)
60. John M. Slaton (60th Governor of Georgia) married Sally Frances Grant
61. Maciej Słomczyński (Polish translator and writer)
62. M. Hoke Smith (U.S. Secretary of the Interior, U.S. Senator, 58th Governor of Georgia) married Marion 'Birdie' Cobb
63. Samuel Spencer (First president of the Southern Railway) married Louisa Vivian Benning
64. Philip Thompson (Kentucky politician) (U. S. Representative from Kentucky)
65. Charles L. Weltner (U.S. Representative from Georgia and Georgia Supreme Court Justice)
66. Barbara Harrison Wescott (publisher)
67. Lloyd Wescott (Agriculturalist, civil servant, and philanthropist) married Barbara Harrison Wescott.
68. Pierce Wetter (New York City Preservationist and Pacifist)
69. Elizabeth Cobbs (Historian and Author)
70. Jerrie Cobb (American Aviator and one of the women of Mercury 13)

The list above is compiled through reference with available genealogical resources from the Library of Virginia, Library of Congress, multimedia referencing through Ancestry.com and through internal wikipedia cross-referencing.
