= Mary E. Cobb =

American manicurist

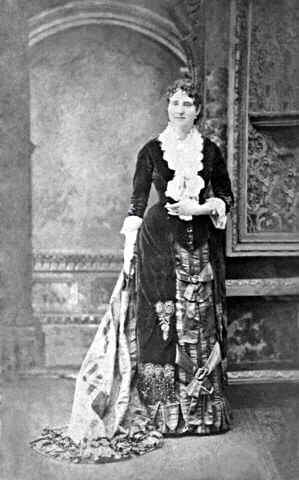
- Mary E. Cobb c. 1880
- Born: Mary Elizabeth Cobb; May 1852; Lynchburg, Virginia
- Died: 30 January 1902 (aged 49); New York, New York
- Occupations: Manicurist, Cosmetics Manufacturer
- Known for: Inventing the modern manicure, emery board

Mary E. Cobb (May 1852 – January 30, 1902) was the first known American manicurist and introduced modern nail manicuring to Britain and the United States.

== Early life ==
Mary E. Cobb was born in May 1852 in Lynchburg, Virginia to Pleasant A. Cobb, a carpenter and Mary Wade. Cobb was a descendant of Ambrose Cobbs, the founder of a prominent and politically powerful southern dynasty who came from England as early as 1635. After the Civil War Cobb moved to New York City with her mother and two brothers. It was in New York in 1874 that she met and married Dr. Joseph Parker Pray, a New England podiatrist who made a fortune purveying foot powders and ladies cosmetics.

== Training and creation of the manicure ==
Tradition is that around the time of her marriage, Cobb traveled to France as a companion to the Baronesse de Rothschild where she learned the art of the nail manicure. Court records and interviews indicate that her husband ordered her to work after their marriage and sent her to be trained in his field, chiropody. Sources from the time indicate that she did learn traditional French manicuring, but the contemporary Victorian culture was uninterested in the process or results of that technique. Cobb redeveloped the process by implementing a series of steps which included soaking the fingers, carefully trimming the nails, then using a specially devised file to shape the nail (not that unlike a carpenter finishing wood). To complete the process, she devised an enamel to ensure that the nail was protected and to give color to the hand.

== Business Development ==
Cobb opened her first Manhattan manicure salon in 1878 as "Mrs. Pray's Manicure". The Salon was an extension of her husband's manufacturing business. Over time Cobb developed a savvy business manner and focused on a higher-end market that evolved into operations at two townhouses on West 23rd street in New York and branches in Chicago, Washington, Boston and Philadelphia. In addition to manicures, Cobb's salons offered hairdressing and skin care. In 1884 Mary E. Cobb and J. Parker Pray divorced, and by court order Mary retained custody of her children and proprietorship of the business, and reverted to her maiden name as Mrs. Mary E. Cobb. In that same year she and her ex-husband made their most lasting contribution to the nail care industry with the invention of the emery board. After her 1884 divorce she expanded into manufacturing, producing her own line of cosmetics, nail care products, powders, and a steam facial machine. She began to tap into a wider emerging market, selling these products in new major department stores and smaller five and dime shops. In addition to retail outlets, Cobb targeted a mail order base and also offered to professionally train women in the nail care trade as a form of expansion.

== Later years ==
At the turn of the 20th century, Mary E. Cobb and Parker Pray held a monopoly on the production and sale of the emery board, along with many other nail care items such as red and pink nail polish. Cobb actively participated in the management of her business for the remainder of her life, seeking to expand and develop her product lines to an ever wider audience. Cobb was known for exhibiting personal interest in both her clients and employees, who often described her as having a "sweet and charming disposition". By 1900, her business was one of the largest female-owned and managed businesses in the world. In 1888 she remarried to John Van Bergen, the son of a wealthy Brooklyn sugar merchant. Cobb and Van Bergen resided in a townhouse on the corner of West 58th Street and 7th Avenue. Cobb died at her New York City home on January 30, 1902.

== Legacy ==
Mary E. Cobb's business enterprises lasted another thirty years following her death before being acquired and folded into other businesses. The industry which she pioneered would outpace her own company, which under her son's direction lacked the innovative speed of newer entities like Max Factor and Elizabeth Arden. The younger Pray's personal mental health issues added to the mismanagement of the business, and by World War II the name Mary Cobb all but disappeared from the retail marketplace. Cobb's lasting contribution is as a predecessor to the modern American nail and cosmetic industry and as an early role model for female owned and operated companies like Elizabeth Arden, Mary Kay, Estee Lauder, and Bobbi Brown.
