= John T. Grant =

American railroad executive (1813–1887)

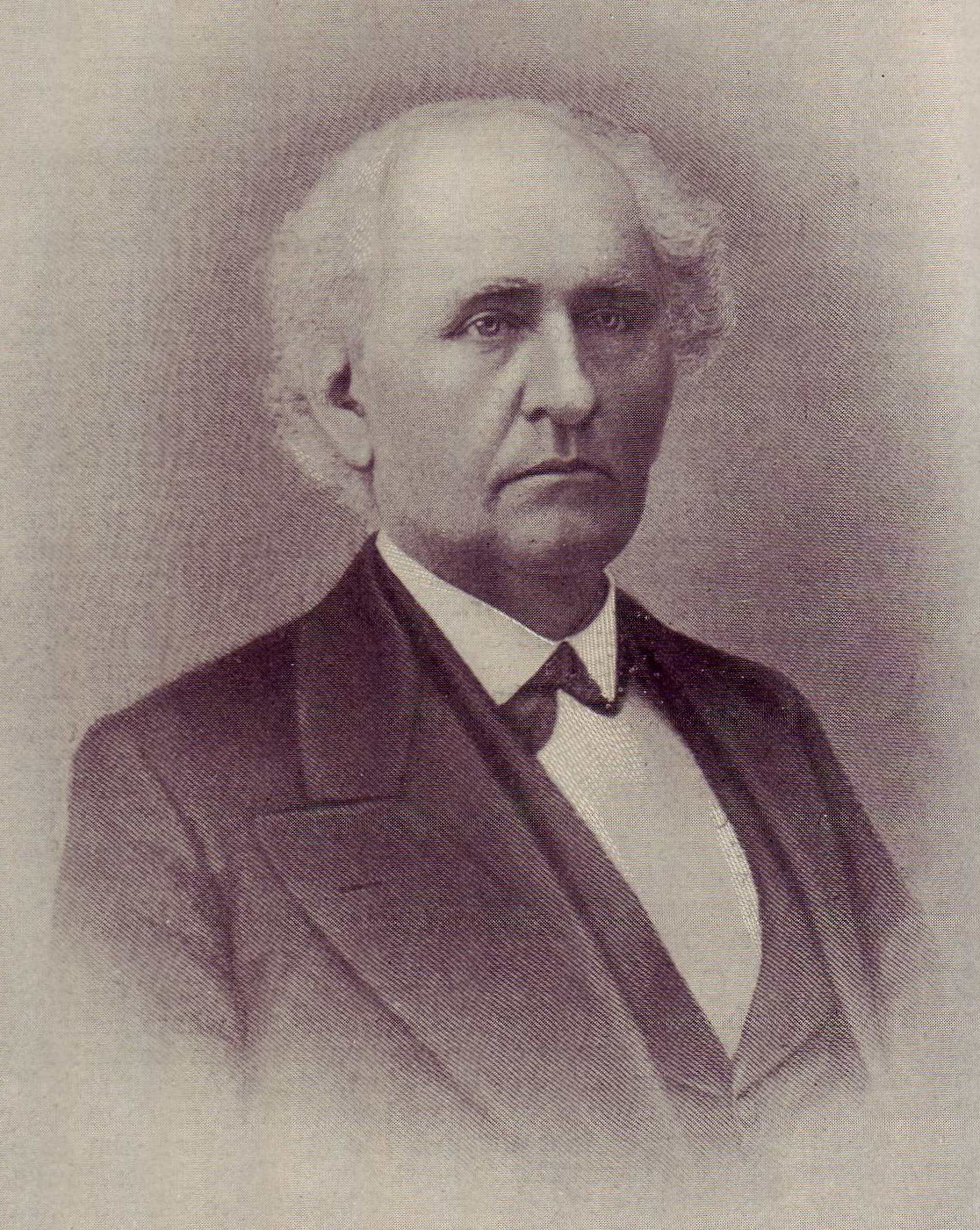
- Born: John Thomas Grant; December 13, 1813; Athens, Georgia
- Died: January 18, 1887 (aged 73); Atlanta, Georgia
- Education: University of Georgia
- Occupations: Founder of engineering firm, land owner

John Thomas Grant (December 13, 1813 – January 18, 1887) was an American railroad executive.

He was born and raised on a farm near Athens, Georgia and graduated from the University of Georgia in 1833 with a degree in forestry.

With his brother James and the unrelated Lemuel Grant he founded an engineering firm called Fannin, Grant and Company which constructed railroads in Georgia, Alabama, Tennessee, Mississippi, Louisiana and Texas, during which time he amassed a large fortune and enormous tracts of land.

The American Civil War largely destroyed his prospects. Although, at the time of his death some 20 years later, he still possessed 60,000 acres (240 km^{2}) in Texas.

He died in Atlanta on January 18, 1887, and was interred in the Grant mausoleum in Oakland Cemetery.

== Family ==
He married Martha Cobb (Jackson) Grant.
