= 2026–27 Singapore Premier League 2 =

Singapore Premier League 2
- Season: 2026–27
- Dates: 24 August 2026 – May 2027
- All statistics correct as of 23 Aug 2026.

The 2026–27 Singapore Premier League 2 was the 2nd season of the Singapore Premier League 2, the reserve league for the top-flight Singaporean association football clubs since the abolishment of the U21 league.

== Format ==
1. Clubs must now register a combined squad for both the SPL and reserve league (SPL2), with a minimum of 36 and a maximum of 50 players. At least 25 local players are to be registered.
2. Each club will play other 3 times in a season.
3. Clubs must field a minimum of six local players (including 4 U23) on the field at all time.

== Stadiums and locations ==
Locations of the 2024–25 Singapore Premier League teams from Singapore

Image	Team	Stadium	Capacity
	FC Jurong II; Tanjong Pagar United II	Jurong East Stadium	2,700
	Lion City Sailors II; Balestier Khalsa II	Bishan Stadium	10,000
	Young Lions B Hougang United II	Jalan Besar Stadium	6,000
	Tampines Rovers II; Geylang International II	Our Tampines Hub	5,100
	Certain matches	Choa Chu Kang Stadium	4,268

== Personnel, kit and sponsoring ==
Note: Flags indicate national team as has been defined under FIFA eligibility rules. Players may hold more than one non-FIFA nationality.

Team	Head coach	Captain	Kit manufacturer	Main shirt sponsor
Albirex Niigata (S) II	(Singapore) Jaswinder Singh		(Japan) Corazon	(Japan) Takasago Singapore
Balestier Khalsa II	(Singapore)		(Spain) Kelme	(Singapore) Emerald Law LLC
Geylang International II	(Singapore) Nor Azli Yusoff		(Thailand) FBT	(Singapore) Vector Green
Hougang United II	(Singapore) (Tunisia) Walid Lounis		(Thailand) Imane	(Japan)
Lion City Sailors II	(Portugal) Bruno Jeremias		(Germany) Adidas	(Singapore) SEA (Singapore) Shopee (Continental)
Tampines Rovers II	(Nigeria) (Singapore) Robert Eziakor		(Thailand) Warrix	(Japan) FBMG
Tanjong Pagar United II	(Singapore) Jaslee Hatta		(Singapore) Throb	(Singapore)
Young Lions B	(Singapore) Syed Azmi	(Singapore)	(Germany) Adidas	(China)

== Results ==
Fixtures are announced on FAS Website.

=== League table ===
Pos	Team	Pld	W	D	L	GF	GA	GD	Pts	Qualification or relegation
1	Geylang International II	6	5	0	1	19	2	+17	15	Champion
2	Balestier Khalsa II	6	4	1	1	10	7	+3	13	
3	Tampines Rovers II	5	4	0	1	18	5	+13	12	
4	Young Lions B	3	2	0	1	10	7	+3	6	
5	FC Jurong II	5	1	1	3	11	12	−1	4	
6	Hougang United II	5	1	1	3	5	13	−8	4	
7	Tanjong Pagar United II	6	1	1	4	8	24	−16	4	
8	Lion City Sailors II	6	1	0	5	7	18	−11	3	

First match(es) will be played: 6 November 2026. Source: Singapore Premier League 2
Rules for classification: 1) points; 2) goal difference; 3) number of goals scored; 4) number of wins

=== Result summary ===
Teams	ALB	BAL	BGT	GEY	HOU	LCS	TPU	YLI
FC Jurong II		-	1–5	-	-	-	-	7–0
FC Jurong II			-		-			-
Balestier Khalsa II	-		2–1	2–1	1–1	-	2–1	-
Balestier Khalsa II	-				-		-	-
Tampines Rovers II	-	-		-	4–0	3–0	5–2	-
Tampines Rovers II		-		-		-		
Geylang International II	3–0	-	-		-	4–0	-	-
Geylang International II		-	-			3–0		
Hougang United II	3–2	-	-	0–1		-	-	-
Hougang United II			-	-		-		-
Lion City Sailors II	-	1–3	-	-	5–1		1–4	-
Lion City Sailors II	-	-					-	-
Tanjong Pagar United II	1–1	-	-	0–7	-	-		0–8
Tanjong Pagar United II	-			-	-			
Young Lions B	-	2–0	-	-	-	-	-	
Young Lions B			-	-			-	

Updated to match(es) played on 6 November 2026. Source: spl.sg
Legend: Blue = left column team win; Yellow = draw; Red = top row team win.
For upcoming matches, an "a" indicates there is an article about the rivalry between the two participants.

=== Fixtures and results ===
==== Round 1 ====
24 August 2026	Tampines Rovers (Singapore)	4–0	(Singapore) Hougang United	Tampines
	Yuma Kimura 16'; Kenshin Yamazaki 21'; Naufal Mohammad 64', 90'; Caden Lim (yellow card) 66'	Report	Lin Ze Hao (yellow card) 67'	Stadium: Our Tampines Hub

24 August 2026	FC Jurong (Japan)	7–0	(Singapore) Young Lions	Jurong East
	Takuma Yamaguchi 12'; Toa Suenaga 13', 32'; Akram Azman 58' (yellow card) 22'; Aloysius Pang 74'; Tyler Matthew Ho Zheng Yu 76' (yellow card) 90'; Ahmad Martin 84'; Seiya Satsukida (yellow card) 45+4'	Report	Erdy Taha (yellow card) 86'	Stadium: Jurong East Stadium

25 August 2026	Lion City Sailors (Singapore)	1–4	(Singapore) Tanjong Pagar United	Jurong East
	Jasper Chen 90'; Tyler Tan (yellow card) 28'		Boris Kopitović 2', 45+1', 66'; Taufik Suparno 7'	Stadium: Jurong East Stadium

25 August 2026	Balestier Khalsa (Singapore)	2–1	(Singapore) Geylang International	Tampines
	Alessandro Lura 44' (o.g.); Timothy Cheng 70' (pen.); Irfan Mika'il (yellow card) 11'; Danial Scott Crichton (yellow card) 72'; Shaddiq Mansor (yellow card) 76'		Harith Kanadi 13'; Ryoya Taniguchi (yellow card) 90+3'	Stadium: Our Tampines Hub

==== Round 2 ====
29 August 2026	Hougang United (Singapore)	0–1	(Singapore) Geylang International	Bishan
	Brant Tan (yellow card) 18'; Lin Zhen hao (yellow card) 30'	Report	Sahil Suhaimi 71'; Putera Muhammad (yellow card) 76'	Stadium: Bishan Stadium

29 August 2026	Young Lions (Singapore)	2–0	(Singapore) Balestier Khalsa	Bukit Gombak
	Nathan Mao 45' (yellow card) 67'; Toi Kagami 90'; Garv Sahoo (yellow card) 33'; Erdy Taha (yellow card) 52'		Shaddiq Mansor (yellow card) 90+3'	Stadium: Bukit Gombak Stadium

30 August 2026	Tampines Rovers (Singapore)	3–0	(Singapore) Lion City Sailors	Tampines
	Matthias Koesno 26' (yellow card) 82'; Naufal Mohammad 42'; Kenshin Yamazaki 60'; Yuma Kimura (yellow card) 45'		Tyler Tan (yellow card) 72'; Aaryan Hermi (yellow card) 85'	Stadium: Our Tampines Hub

30 August 2026	Tanjong Pagar United (Singapore)	1–1	(Singapore) FC Jurong	Jurong East
	Marvin Anieboh 45+1'; Boris Kopitović (yellow card) 5'; Marcus Mosses (yellow card) 46'; Taufik Suparno (yellow card) 52'; Syed Akmal (yellow card) 76'; Samuel Pillai (yellow card) 77'	Report	Toa Suenaga 45+1'; Seo Seung-woo (yellow card) 5'; Akram Azman (yellow card) 21'; Christopher van Huizen (yellow card) 65'; Takuma Yamaguchi (yellow card) 88'	Stadium: Jurong East Stadium

==== Round 3 ====
2 September 2026	Balestier Khalsa (Singapore)	1–1	(Singapore) Hougang United	Bedok
	Danial Crichton 71' (yellow card) 89'; Woo Chun Wei (yellow card) 15'; Irfan Mika'il (yellow card) 57'	Report	Wong Ngaang Haang 54'; Lin Ze Hao (yellow card) 15'	Stadium: Bedok Stadium

2 September 2026	Tanjong Pagar United (Singapore)	0–8	(Singapore) Young Lions	Jurong East
	Daniyal Lynn Rasor (yellow card) 67'; Anaqee Basheer (yellow card) 80'		Hisatoshi Nishido 5'; Louka Tan 8', 37', 40', 42', 90+2'; Toi Kagami 17'; Fairuz Fazli 25'	Stadium: Jurong East Stadium

3 September 2026	Geylang International (Singapore)	4–0	(Singapore) Lion City Sailors	Bedok
	Ryoya Taniguchi 27'; Sahil Suhaimi 84'; Ryang Hyon-ju 87', 90'		Caden Pereira (yellow card) 82'	Stadium: Bedok Stadium

3 September 2026	FC Jurong (Singapore)	1–5	(Singapore) Tampines Rovers	Jurong East
	Syed Firdaus Hassan 29'; Andrew Aw (yellow card) 50'	Report	Yuma Kimura 11'; Naufal Mohammad 70', 73'; Kenshin Yamazaki 87', 90'; Adly Nufail (yellow card) 48'	Stadium: Jurong East Stadium

==== Round 4 ====
7 September 2026	Geylang International (Singapore)	3–0	(Singapore) FC Jurong	Tampines
	Dejan Račić 6'; Ryang Hyon-ju 28'; Sahil Suhaimi 90'; Raiyan Noor (yellow card) 41'; Alessandro Lura (yellow card) 77'	Report	Izz Anaqi (yellow card) 16'; Tyler Matthew Ho Zheng Yu (yellow card) 63'	Stadium: Our Tampines Hub

7 September 2026	Balestier Khalsa (Singapore)	2–1	(Singapore) Tanjong Pagar United	Jurong East
	Syafi Hilman 62'; Adam Faisal 64'		Lim Xuan Hui 40' (yellow card) 79'; Loukas Ng (yellow card) 55'; Irfan Mika'il (yellow card) 71'	Stadium: Jurong East Stadium

8 September 2026	Lion City Sailors (Singapore)	5–1	(Singapore) Hougang United	Bedok
	Aufa Basyar 16', 50'; Izzan Rifqi 35', 45+2'; Ahmad Danial 87'	Report	Nigel Ho 58'; Farhan Sahlan (yellow card) 59'	Stadium: Bedok Stadium; Referee: Jansen Foo

30 November 2026 Rescheduled	Young Lions (Singapore)	–	(Singapore) Tampines Rovers	Jalan Besar
				Stadium: Jalan Besar Stadium

==== Round 5 ====
19 October 2026	Lion City Sailors (Singapore)	1–3	(Singapore) Balestier Khalsa	Bedok
			Danie Hafiy 40'; Zikos Chua 81' (pen.); Ethan Pinto 82'	Stadium: Bedok Stadium

19 October 2026	Tampines Rovers (Singapore)	5–2	(Singapore) Tanjong Pagar United	Jurong East
				Stadium: Jurong East Stadium

20 October 2026	Hougang United (Singapore)	3–2	(Singapore) FC Jurong	Tampines
				Stadium: Our Tampines Hub

23 November 2026 Rescheduled	Young Lions (Singapore)	–	(Singapore) Geylang International	Bedok
				Stadium: Bedok Stadium

==== Round 6 ====
6 November 2026	Balestier Khalsa (Singapore)	2–1	(Singapore) Tampines Rovers	Bedok
				Stadium: Bedok Stadium

6 November 2026	Tanjong Pagar United (Singapore)	0–7	(Singapore) Geylang International	Jurong East
				Stadium: Jurong East Stadium

7 November 2026	FC Jurong (Singapore)	–	(Singapore) Lion City Sailors	Jurong East
				Stadium: Jurong East Stadium

9 December 2026 Rescheduled	Hougang United (Singapore)	–	(Singapore) Young Lions	Tampines
				Stadium: Our Tampines Hub

==== Round 7 ====
5 December 2026	Young Lions (Singapore)	–	(Singapore) Lion City Sailors	Bedok
				Stadium: Bedok Stadium

5 December 2026	Tanjong Pagar United (Singapore)	–	(Singapore) Hougang United	Jurong East
				Stadium: Jurong East Stadium

6 December 2026	FC Jurong (Singapore)	–	(Singapore) Balestier Khalsa	Jurong East
				Stadium: Jurong East Stadium

6 December 2026	Geylang International (Singapore)	–	(Singapore) Tampines Rovers	Bedok
				Stadium: Bedok Stadium

==== Round 8 ====
12 December 2026	Geylang International (Singapore)	–	(Singapore) Balestier Khalsa	Bedok
				Stadium: Bedok Stadium

12 December 2026	Young Lions (Singapore)	–	(Singapore) FC Jurong	Jurong East
				Stadium: Jurong East Stadium

13 December 2026	Lion City Sailors (Singapore)	–	(Singapore) Tanjong Pagar United	Bedok
				Stadium: Bedok Stadium

13 December 2026	Tampines Rovers (Singapore)	–	(Singapore) Hougang United	Tampines
				Stadium: Our Tampines Hub

==== Round 9 ====
16 December 2026	Lion City Sailors (Singapore)	–	(Singapore) Tampines Rovers	Bedok
				Stadium: Bedok Stadium

16 December 2026	Balestier Khalsa (Singapore)	–	(Singapore) Young Lions	Bishan
				Stadium: Bishan Stadium

16 December 2026	FC Jurong (Singapore)	–	(Singapore) Tanjong Pagar United	Jurong East
				Stadium: Jurong East Stadium

16 December 2026	Hougang United (Singapore)	–	(Singapore) Geylang International	Tampines
				Stadium: Our Tampines Hub

==== Round 10 ====
20 September 2026 Rescheduled	Geylang International (Singapore)	3–0	(Singapore) Lion City Sailors	Bedok
	Ryoya Taniguchi 19', 45'; Milan Landreman 33'; Diego Aspiras (yellow card) 31'; Sahil Suhaimi (yellow card) 32'		Caden Pereira (yellow card) 51'; Aiman Eszuan (yellow card) 90'; Aryan Bahadur Chhetri (yellow card) 90+1'	Stadium: Bedok Stadium; Referee: Thawfeek Ahamad

20 December 2026	Hougang United (Singapore)	–	(Singapore) Balestier Khalsa	Bishan
				Stadium: Bishan Stadium

20 December 2026	Tanjong Pagar United (Singapore)	–	(Singapore) Young Lions	Jurong East
				Stadium: Jurong East Stadium

20 December 2026	Tampines Rovers (Singapore)	–	(Singapore) FC Jurong	Tampines
				Stadium: Our Tampines Hub

==== Round 11 ====
5 January 2027	Lion City Sailors (Singapore)	–	(Singapore) Hougang United	Bedok
				Stadium: Bedok Stadium

5 January 2027	FC Jurong (Singapore)	–	(Singapore) Geylang International	Choa Chu Kang
				Stadium: Choa Chu Kang Stadium

5 January 2027	Tanjong Pagar United (Singapore)	–	(Singapore) Balestier Khalsa	Jurong East
				Stadium: Jurong East Stadium

5 January 2027	Young Lions (Singapore)	–	(Singapore) Tampines Rovers	Tampines
				Stadium: Our Tampines Hub

==== Round 12 ====
8 January 2027	Geylang International (Singapore)	–	(Singapore) Young Lions	Bedok
				Stadium: Bedok Stadium

8 January 2027	Balestier Khalsa (Singapore)	–	(Singapore) Lion City Sailors	Bishan
				Stadium: Bishan Stadium

8 January 2027	FC Jurong (Singapore)	–	(Singapore) Hougang United	Jurong East
				Stadium: Jurong East Stadium

8 January 2027	Tanjong Pagar United (Singapore)	–	(Singapore) Tampines Rovers	Tampines
				Stadium: Our Tampines Hub

==== Round 13 ====
12 January 2027	Geylang International (Singapore)	–	(Singapore) Tanjong Pagar United	Bedok
				Stadium: Bedok Stadium

12 January 2027	Hougang United (Singapore)	–	(Singapore) Young Lions	Choa Chu Kang
				Stadium: Choa Chu Kang Stadium

12 January 2027	Lion City Sailors (Singapore)	–	(Singapore) FC Jurong	Jurong East
				Stadium: Jurong East Stadium

12 January 2027	Tampines Rovers (Singapore)	–	(Singapore) Balestier Khalsa	Tampines
				Stadium: Our Tampines Hub

==== Round 14 ====
16 January 2027	Young Lions (Singapore)	–	(Singapore) Lion City Sailors	Bedok
				Stadium: Bedok Stadium

16 January 2027	Balestier Khalsa (Singapore)	–	(Singapore) FC Jurong	Bishan
				Stadium: Bishan Stadium

16 January 2027	Tanjong Pagar United (Singapore)	–	(Singapore) Hougang United	Jurong East
				Stadium: Jurong East Stadium

16 January 2027	Tampines Rovers (Singapore)	–	(Singapore) Geylang International	Tampines
				Stadium: Our Tampines Hub

==== Round 15 ====
20 January 2027	Balestier Khalsa (Singapore)	–	(Singapore) Geylang International	Bedok
				Stadium: Bedok Stadium

20 January 2027	Tanjong Pagar United (Singapore)	–	(Singapore) Lion City Sailors	Choa Chu Kang
				Stadium: Choa Chu Kang Stadium

20 January 2027	FC Jurong (Singapore)	–	(Singapore) Young Lions	Jurong East
				Stadium: Jurong East Stadium

20 January 2027	Hougang United (Singapore)	–	(Singapore) Tampines Rovers	Bishan
				Stadium: Bishan Stadium

==== Round 16 ====
24 January 2027	Geylang International (Singapore)	–	(Singapore) Hougang United	Bedok
				Stadium: Bedok Stadium

24 January 2027	Young Lions (Singapore)	–	(Singapore) Balestier Khalsa	Bishan
				Stadium: Bishan Stadium

24 January 2027	FC Jurong (Singapore)	–	(Singapore) Tanjong Pagar United	Jurong East
				Stadium: Jurong East Stadium

24 January 2027	Lion City Sailors (Singapore)	–	(Singapore) Tampines Rovers	Tampines
				Stadium: Our Tampines Hub

==== Round 17 ====
30 January 2027	Lion City Sailors (Singapore)	–	(Singapore) Geylang International	Bedok
				Stadium: Bedok Stadium

30 January 2027	Balestier Khalsa (Singapore)	–	(Singapore) Hougang United	Bishan
				Stadium: Bishan Stadium

30 January 2027	Young Lions (Singapore)	–	(Singapore) Tanjong Pagar United	Jurong East
				Stadium: Jurong East Stadium

30 January 2027	Tampines Rovers (Singapore)	–	(Singapore) FC Jurong	Tampines
				Stadium: Our Tampines Hub

==== Round 18 ====
3 February 2027	Geylang International (Singapore)	–	(Singapore) FC Jurong	Bedok
				Stadium: Bedok Stadium

3 February 2027	Hougang United (Singapore)	–	(Singapore) Lion City Sailors	Choa Chu Kang
				Stadium: Choa Chu Kang Stadium

3 February 2027	Tanjong Pagar United (Singapore)	–	(Singapore) Balestier Khalsa	Jurong East
				Stadium: Jurong East Stadium

3 February 2027	Tampines Rovers (Singapore)	–	(Singapore) Young Lions	Tampines
				Stadium: Our Tampines Hub

==== Round 19 ====
22 February 2027	Young Lions (Singapore)	–	(Singapore) Geylang International	Bedok
				Stadium: Bedok Stadium

22 February 2027	Tanjong Pagar United (Singapore)	–	(Singapore) Tampines Rovers	Bukit Gombak
				Stadium: Bukit Gombak Stadium

22 February 2027	FC Jurong (Singapore)	–	(Singapore) Hougang United	Jurong East
				Stadium: Jurong East Stadium

22 February 2027	Lion City Sailors (Singapore)	–	(Singapore) Balestier Khalsa	Tampines
				Stadium: Our Tampines Hub

==== Round 20 ====
1 March 2027	Geylang International (Singapore)	–	(Singapore) Tanjong Pagar United	Bedok
				Stadium: Bedok Stadium

1 March 2027	Young Lions (Singapore)	–	(Singapore) Hougang United	Bukit Gombak
				Stadium: Bukit Gombak Stadium

1 March 2027	FC Jurong (Singapore)	–	(Singapore) Lion City Sailors	Jurong East
				Stadium: Jurong East Stadium

1 March 2027	Balestier Khalsa (Singapore)	–	(Singapore) Tampines Rovers	Tampines
				Stadium: Our Tampines Hub

==== Round 21 ====
5 April 2027	Lion City Sailors (Singapore)	–	(Singapore) Young Lions	Bedok
				Stadium: Bedok Stadium

5 April 2027	Hougang United (Singapore)	–	(Singapore) Tanjong Pagar United	Bukit Gombak
				Stadium: Bukit Gombak Stadium

5 April 2027	Balestier Khalsa (Singapore)	–	(Singapore) FC Jurong	Jurong East
				Stadium: Jurong East Stadium

5 April 2027	Tampines Rovers (Singapore)	–	(Singapore) Geylang International	Tampines
				Stadium: Our Tampines Hub

== Statistics ==
=== Top scorers ===
As of 20 Sept 2026

Rank	Player	Team	Goals
1	(Singapore) Naufal Mohammad	(Singapore) Tampines Rovers II	5
1	(Singapore) (France) Louka Tan	(Singapore) Young Lions II	5
2	(Japan) Kenshin Yamazaki	(Singapore) Tampines Rovers II	4
3	(Japan) Toa Suenaga	(Singapore) FC Jurong II	3
3	(Japan) Ryoya Taniguchi	(Singapore) Geylang International II	3
3	(Singapore) Sahil Suhaimi	(Singapore) Geylang International II	3
3	(North Korea) Ryang Hyon-ju	(Singapore) Geylang International II	3
3	(Montenegro) Boris Kopitović	(Singapore) Tanjong Pagar United II	3
4	(Singapore) Aufa Basyar	(Singapore) Lion City Sailors II	2
4	(Singapore) Izzan Rifqi	(Singapore) Lion City Sailors II	2
4	(Japan) Yuma Kimura	(Singapore) Tampines Rovers II	2
4	(Japan) Toi Kagami	(Singapore) Young Lions II	2
5	(Singapore) (Scotland) (Canada) Danial Crichton	(Singapore) Balestier Khalsa II	1
5	(Singapore) Timothy Cheng	(Singapore) Balestier Khalsa II	1
5	(Singapore) Syafi Hilman	(Singapore) Balestier Khalsa II	1
5	(Singapore) Adam Faisal	(Singapore) Balestier Khalsa II	1
5	(Japan) Takuma Yamaguchi	(Singapore) FC Jurong II	1
5	(Japan) Ahmad Martin	(Singapore) FC Jurong II	1
5	(Japan) Akram Azman	(Singapore) FC Jurong II	1
5	(Singapore) Aloysius Pang	(Singapore) FC Jurong II	1
5	(Singapore) Tyler Matthew Ho Zheng Yu	(Singapore) FC Jurong II	1
5	(Singapore) Syed Firdaus Hassan	(Singapore) FC Jurong II	1
5	(Singapore) Harith Kanadi	(Singapore) Geylang International II	1
5	(United States) Milan Landreman	(Singapore) Geylang International II	1
5	(Montenegro) Dejan Račić	(Singapore) Geylang International II	1
5	(Singapore) Wong Ngaang Haang	(Singapore) Hougang United II	1
5	(Singapore) Ahmad Daniel	(Singapore) Lion City Sailors II	1
5	(Singapore) (Taiwan) Jasper Chen	(Singapore) Lion City Sailors II	1
5	(Singapore) Matthias Josaphat Koesno	(Singapore) Tampines Rovers II	1
5	(Spain) Marvin Anieboh	(Singapore) Tanjong Pagar United II	1
5	(Singapore) Lim Xuan Hui	(Singapore) Tanjong Pagar United II	1
5	(Singapore) Taufik Suparno	(Singapore) Tanjong Pagar United II	1
5	(Singapore) Nathan Mao	(Singapore) Young Lions II	1
5	(Singapore) Fairuz Fazli	(Singapore) Young Lions II	1
5	(Japan) Hisatoshi Nishido	(Singapore) Young Lions II	1
