= 2025–26 Lion City Sailors FC youth season =

Lion City Sailors
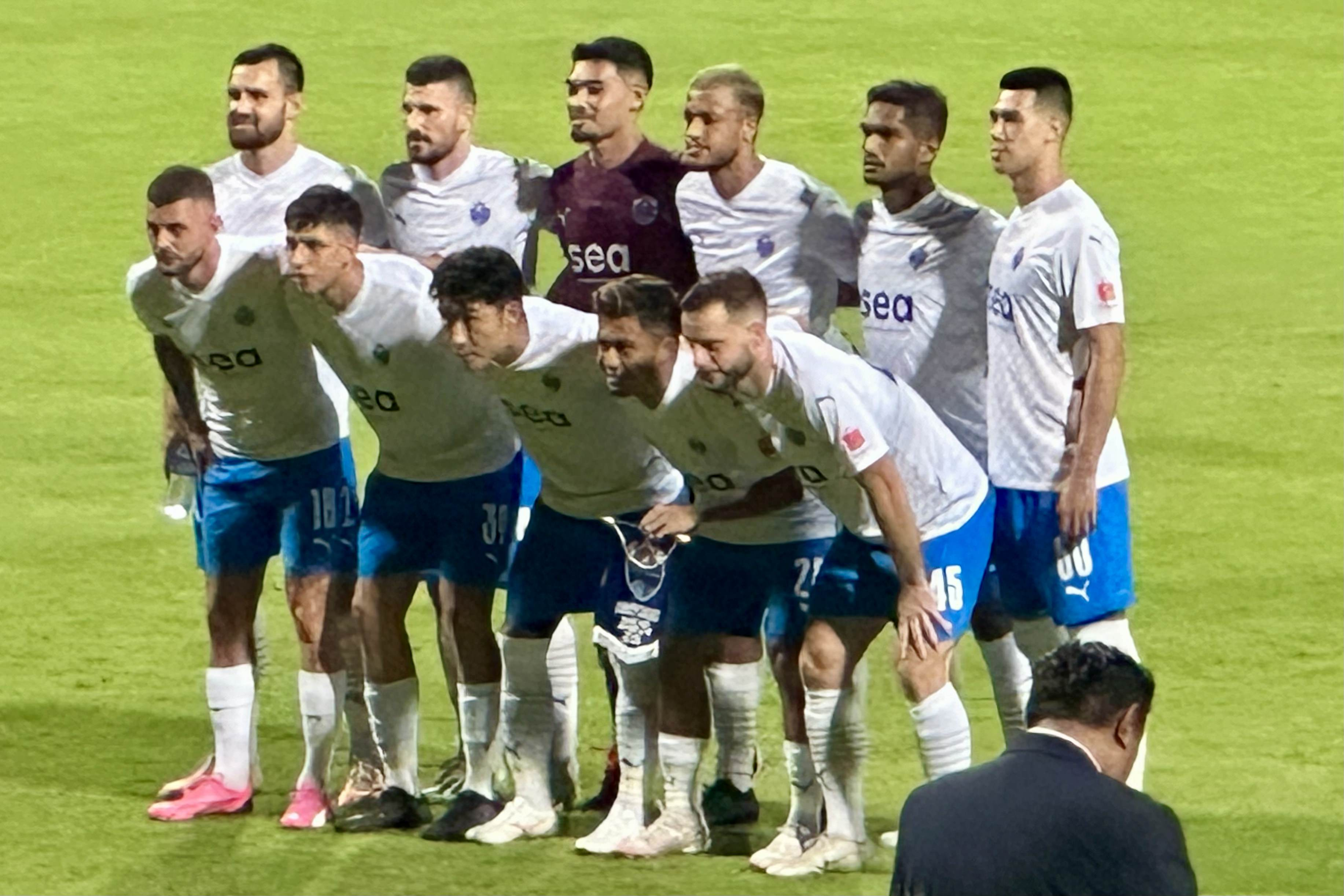
- Match between Lion City Sailors and Johor Darul Ta'zim
- Owner: Sea Limited
- Chairman: Forrest Li
- Head coach: Aleksandar Ranković
- Stadium: Bishan Stadium
- Singapore Premier League: Pre-season
Home colours	Away colours

The 2025–26 season is Lion City Sailors' 30th consecutive season in the Singapore Premier League and the 6th season since privatising from Home United.

== Squad ==
=== U21 squad ===
Squad No.	Name	Nationality	Date of birth (age)	Previous club	Contract since	Contract end
Goalkeepers
	Kaiden Ng ^{U21}	(Singapore)	17 October 2006 (age 19)	(Singapore) Lion City Sailors U15	2023	2023
Defenders
Midfielders
67	Izzan Rifqi ^{U21}	(Singapore)	4 March 2010 (age 16)	(Singapore) Lion City Sailors U17	2022	2025
76	Farrel Mohammad ^{U21}	(Singapore)	15 March 2009 (age 17)	(Singapore) Lion City Sailors U17	2022	2024
	Yasir Nizamudin ^{U21}	(Singapore)	21 January 2005 (age 21)	(Singapore) Mattar Sailors	2022	2025
	Jan Tze	(Singapore)		(Singapore) Sailors Development Center U17	2024	2026
Forwards
70	Ewan Seddon ^{U21}	(England) (Japan)	1 November 2008 (age 17)	(Singapore) Lion City Sailors U17	2024	2025
72	Ilyasin Zayan ^{U21}	(Singapore) (England)	22 March 2004 (age 22)	(Singapore) SAFSA	2022	2025
73	Ahmad Luthfi Rusfatzilella ^{U21}	(Singapore)	15 August 2007 (age 18)	Singapore Sports School	2023	2025
Players loaned out
51	Ashman Saravanan ^{U21}	(Malaysia)	5 March 2008 (age 18)	(Malaysia) JDT Academy	2024	2025
53	Ainun Nuha Ilyasir ^{U21}	(Singapore)	11 March 2006 (age 20)	(Singapore) Lion City Sailors U17	2022	2025
54	Harith Luth Hadi ^{U21}	(Singapore)	19 March 2008 (age 18)	(Singapore) Lion City Sailors U17	2022	2025
55	Jonan Tan En Yuan ^{U21}	(Singapore)	27 June 2006 (age 19)	(Singapore) Young Lions	2022	2025
56	Muhammad Fadly ^{U21}	(Singapore)	30 May 2007 (age 19)	(Singapore) Lion City Sailors U17	2023	2025
57	Enrico Walmrath Silveira ^{U21}	(Brazil)	6 April 2006 (age 20)	(Singapore) Lion City Sailors U17	2023	2026
58	Iliya Naufal ^{U21}	(Singapore)	6 July 2008 (age 17)	Singapore Sports School	2024	2025
59	Ilhan Rizqullah ^{U21}	(Singapore)	17 September 2008 (age 17)	(Singapore) Lion City Sailors U17	2022	2025
60	Benjamin Žerak ^{U21}	(Slovenia)	14 December 2006 (age 19)	(Slovenia) FC Koper U19	2025	2027
61	Andy Reefqy ^{U21}	(Singapore)	14 July 2008 (age 17)	Singapore Sports School	2023	2025
64	Harith Danish Irwan ^{U21}	(Singapore)	27 November 2008 (age 17)	Singapore Sports School	2024	2025
66	Sarrvin Raj ^{U21}	(Singapore)	5 April 2008 (age 18)	(Singapore) Lion City Sailors U15	2022	2025
59	Qaisy Noranzor ^{U21}	(Singapore)	24 January 2006 (age 20)	(Singapore) Mattar Sailors	2022	2023
63	Idzham Eszuan ^{U21}	(Singapore)	14 February 2007 (age 19)	(Singapore) Lion City Sailors U17	2022	2025
67	Issac Goh Jun Yang ^{U21}	(Singapore)	5 June 2007 (age 19)	(Singapore) Lion City Sailors U15	2022	2025
70	Kieran Aryan Azhari ^{U21}	(Singapore)	31 May 2003 (age 23)	(Singapore) Lion City Sailors U17	2021	2025
71	Yazid Rais ^{U21}	(Singapore)	16 March 2006 (age 20)	(Singapore) Lion City Sailors U17	2022	2025
71	Kian Ghadessy ^{U21}	(Singapore) (Iran)	30 November 2005 (age 20)	(Singapore) Balestier Khalsa U21	2024	2025
74	Tiago Martins ^{U21}	(Portugal)	8 February 2005 (age 21)	(Portugal) AVS Futebol SAD U19	2024	2025
75	Harry Spence ^{U21}	(England)	15 March 2006 (age 20)	(England) Hull City U18	2024	2025
78	Danie Hafiy ^{U21}	(Singapore)	6 April 2004 (age 22)	(Singapore) Hougang United U21	2022	2025
79	Aniq Raushan ^{U21}	(Singapore)	5 October 2003 (age 22)	(Singapore) SAFSA	2021	2025
	Marcus Mosses ^{U21}	(Singapore)	21 January 2005 (age 21)	(Singapore) Tanjong Pagar United	2022	2027
	Fernandez Casey Klein ^{U21}	(Singapore) (Germany)	5 February 2007 (age 19)	(Singapore) Lion City Sailors U21	2023	2025
	Izrafil Yusof ^{U21}	(Singapore)	27 January 2004 (age 22)	(Singapore) Tanjong Pagar United	2022	2027
	Aniq Tiryaq ^{U21}	(Singapore)	10 October 2006 (age 19)	(Singapore) Lion City Sailors U17	2021	2025
	Uvayn Kumar ^{U21}	(Singapore)	25 May 2005 (age 21)	(Singapore) Mattar Sailors	2022	2025
	Aqil Khusni ^{U21}	(Singapore)	23 April 2004 (age 22)	(Singapore) Mattar Sailors	2022	2023
	Uchenna Eziakor ^{U21}	(Singapore) (Nigeria)	17 May 2008 (age 18)	(Spain) ESC La Liga Academy	2022	2025
Players left during the season

=== U17 / AFA DC U17 squad ===
Squad No.	Name	Nationality	Date of birth (age)	Previous club	Contract since	Contract end
Goalkeeper
31	Seth Lee ^{AFA DC U17}	(Singapore)		(Singapore)	2024	2024
39	Dhruv Bafna ^{U17}	(India)	January 2009	(Singapore) Lion City Sailors U15	2022	2023
40	Luthfi Sufaiqish ^{U17}	(Singapore)		(Singapore) Anglo-Chinese School	2024	2024
	Ilhan Hady ^{U17}	(Singapore)	19 March 2010 (age 16)	(Singapore) Lion City Sailors U15	2023	
	Luthfi Naqeeb Syazani ^{U17}	(Singapore)	23 August 2010 (age 15)	(Singapore) Lion City Sailors U15	2023	
	Arnav Kumar ^{U17}	(India) (Singapore)	24 February 2010 (age 16)	(Singapore) Lion City Sailors U15	2023	
Defenders
21	Haziq Yazid ^{AFA DC U17}	(Singapore)		Singapore Sports School	2024	2024
28	Caden Pereira ^{U17}	(Singapore)	3 February 2010 (age 16)	(Singapore) Lion City Sailors U15	2022	2025
36	Zamir Nasri ^{U17}	(Singapore)	6 March 2009 (age 17)	(Singapore) Lion City Sailors U15	2022	2025
39	Ayden Haziq ^{U17}	(Singapore)	27 September 2009 (age 16)	(Singapore) Lion City Sailors U15	2022	2024
44	Noor Aiman Eszuan ^{U17}	(Singapore)	1 December 2009 (age 16)	(Singapore) Lion City Sailors U15	2022	2024
73	Caleb Leo Chin Hee ^{U17}	(Singapore)	28 March 2010 (age 16)	(Singapore) Lion City Sailors U15	2022	2025
84	Darwisy Fitri ^{U17}	(Singapore)	18 February 2009 (age 17)	(Singapore)	2025	2025
	Jacas Tjhai Jun Heo ^{U17}	(Singapore)	5 January 2010 (age 16)	(Singapore) Lion City Sailors U15	2022	2025
	Shlok Ranadive ^{U17}	(Singapore)	10 June 2010 (age 16)	(Singapore)	2025	
	Aaryan Azraqi Hermi ^{U17}	(Singapore)	24 February 2009 (age 17)	(Singapore)	2025	
Midfielders
16	Tan Yu Bin ^{U17}	(Singapore)		(Singapore) Lion City Sailors U15	2024	2025
13	Caleb Tan Kai Zhe ^{AFA DC U17}	(Singapore)	2010	(Singapore) Lion City Sailors U13	2022	2025
22	Xavier Tan Shan Yang ^{AFA DC U17}	(Singapore)		(Singapore)	2023	2024
27	Aydin Adfan ^{U17}	(India)	2009	(Singapore) Lion City Sailors U15	2022	2023
31	Iliya Asano ^{U17}	(Japan) (Belarus)	7 November 2010 (age 15)	(Singapore) Lion City Sailors U15	2022	2025
41	Adam Faisal ^{U17}	(Singapore)	1 December 2009 (age 16)	(Singapore) Sailors Development Center U15	2022	2025
	Aiman Zayani Yazid ^{U17}	(Singapore)		Singapore Sports School	2024	2024
	Aryan Sahib ^{U17}	(Singapore)	12 September 2009 (age 16)	(Singapore) Lion City Sailors U15	2022	
	Dante James Pinto ^{U17}	(Singapore)	20 January 2010 (age 16)	(Singapore) Lion City Sailors U15	2023	
82	Aqil Zulkarnain Supandy ^{AFA DC U17}	(Singapore)		(Singapore)	2023	2025
	Bryan Khng En ^{AFA DC U17}	(Singapore)		(Singapore) Sailors Development Center	2023	2024
	Thomas Cunning ^{U17}	(Singapore)	3 June 2008 (age 18)	(Singapore) Turf City FC	2022	2022
Strikers
18	Fikri Aqil Shalihan ^{LCSFA U17}	(Singapore)		(Singapore) Lion City Sailors U15	2023	Dec 2025
22	Tan Zheng Rui ^{LCSFA U17}	(Singapore)		(Singapore) Lion City Sailors U15	2023	Dec 2025
30	Tyler Tan ^{U17}	(Singapore)	7 July 2010 (age 15)	(Singapore) Lion City Sailors U15	2023	2025
35	Farrel Farhan ^{U17}	(Singapore)		(Singapore) Lion City Sailors U15	2022	2025
83	Danish Irfan ^{U17}	(Singapore)	6 May 2009 (age 17)	(Singapore) Lion City Sailors U15	2022	2025
9	Jadon Quah Song Yee ^{AFA DC U17}	(Singapore)	20 April 2008 (age 18)	(Singapore) Active Football SG	2023	2025
16	Ryan Seak Zheng Wei ^{AFA DC U17}	(Singapore)		(Singapore)	2024	2024
10	Siddharth Bansal ^{U17}	(India)	September 2009	(Spain) FC Barcelona U19	2022	N/A
Players who left mid season

=== U16/15 squad ===
Squad No.	Name	Nationality	Date of birth (age)	Previous club	Contract since	Contract end
Goalkeepers
68	Kaden Foo ^{U15}	(Singapore)	2010		2023	2023
	Shahrul Ashari ^{U15}	(Singapore)	2010		2023	2023
73	Emre Masjuri ^{AFA DC U15}	(Singapore)	2009		2023	2023
Defenders
32	Issac Matthew Saw Tian Zhi ^{U16}	(Singapore) (Malaysia)	2010	(Singapore) Lion City Sailors U13	2023	2024
70	Yeo Boon Chin ^{AFA DC U16}	(Singapore)		(Singapore)	2023	2023
28	Ciaran Wen Ye Chew ^{U15}	(Singapore)		(Singapore) Lion City Sailors U13	2023	2023
30	Kellan Woolfe ^{U15}	(United States) (Singapore)	2009	(Singapore) Lion City Sailors U13	2022	2023
31	Matthew Wee ^{U15}	(Singapore)	2009	(Singapore) Lion City Sailors U13	2022	2023
38	Kai Kaidan Farrell ^{U15}	(Singapore)		(Singapore) Lion City Sailors U13	2023	2023
56	Danial Fadli ^{U15}	(Singapore)		(Singapore)	2023	2023
59	Shahbil Fitri ^{U15}	(Singapore)		(Singapore)	2023	2023
63	Ong Ding Hao ^{U15}	(Singapore)		(Singapore)	2023	2023
77	Jevam Ong ^{U15}	(Singapore)		(Singapore)	2023	2023
	Bryan Chua Tian Ci ^{U15}	(Singapore)	17 September 2009 (age 16)	(Singapore) Lion City Sailors U13	2022	2023
43	Joshua Chong Rong Kai ^{AFA DC U15}	(Singapore)	17 September 2009 (age 16)	(Singapore) Sailors Development Centre	2022	2024
	Riz Ilhan Ashriq ^{AFA DC U15}	(Singapore)		(Singapore)	2023	2024
Midfielders
8	Iman Naqib Idris ^{U15}	(Singapore)		(Singapore)	2023	2025
22	Yang Seojun ^{U15}	(South Korea)		(Singapore)	2025	2025
52	Adryan Putera ^{U15}	(Singapore)		(Singapore)	2023	2024
23	Theeraj Kumar ^{AFA DC U16}	(Singapore)			2024	2025
32	Erfan Nurhan Fazly ^{AFA DC U16}	(Singapore)			2024	2024
35	Issac Ng Wei Wen ^{AFA DC U16}	(Singapore)			2024	2024
42	Kadhir Maran Ajai ^{AFA DC U16}	(Singapore)			2024	2024
53	Karlheinz Oma Koppe ^{AFA DC U16}	(Germany) (Singapore)			2024	2024
70	Yeo Boon Chin ^{AFA DC U16}	(Singapore)		(Singapore)	2023	2024
84	Bavesh Kumar ^{AFA DC U16}	(Singapore)			2024	2024
42	Foo Yong Ze ^{U15}	(Singapore)		(Singapore)	2023	2023
58	Owl Zhe Han Jairus ^{AFA DC U16}	(Singapore)		(Singapore)	2024	2024
64	Tan Kayne Jin ^{U15}	(Singapore)		(Singapore)	2023	2023
65	Danish Anaqi ^{AFA DC U16}	(Singapore)		(Singapore)	2023	2023
66	Danish Haikal ^{U15}	(Singapore)		(Singapore)	2023	2023
79	Leandro Naim Santos ^{AFA DC U16}	(Singapore) (Brazil)			2023	2024
81	Connor John Forsyth ^{AFA DC U16}	(Argentina)			2023	2023
Strikers
30	Yu Kichji ^{AFA DC U15}	(Singapore)	6 August 2010 (age 15)	(Singapore) Sailors Development Centre	2023	2025
9	Adryan Alfian ^{U16}	(Singapore)		(Singapore)	2023	2024
10	Aufa Basyar ^{U15}	(Singapore)		(Singapore)	2023	2025
32	Nguyen Yaqine Nathan Sen ^{AFA DC U16}	(Singapore) (Vietnam)			2024	2024
36	Varghese Ethan Joseph ^{U15}	(Singapore) (India)		(Singapore) Turf City FC	2024	2024
50	John Gipson Adriel ^{AFA DC U16}	(Singapore)			2024	2024
19	Khilfy Zulfael ^{U15}	(Singapore)	2010	(Singapore) Lion City Sailors U13	2022	2023
	Asher Toh ^{U15}	(Singapore)	13 May 2010 (age 16)	(Singapore)	2023	2023
	Reyes Chang Yu Fung ^{U15}	(Singapore)	15 January 2010 (age 16)	(Singapore)	2023	2023
	Dylan Ng Jing Hang ^{U15}	(Singapore)		(Singapore) Sailors Development Centre	2023	2023

=== U14/13 squad ===
Squad No.	Name	Nationality	Date of birth (age)	Previous club	Contract since	Contract end
Goalkeepers
Defenders
2	Isyraf Khan Fhirhad ^{U14}	(Singapore)		(Singapore)	2024	2024
16	Aaron Ikechukwu Emuejeraye ^{U14}	(Singapore) (Nigeria)		(Singapore)	2024	2024
77	Saif Aqasha Faizal ^{U14}	(Singapore)		(Singapore)	2024	2024
3	Malikh Khairil ^{U13}	(Singapore)		(Singapore)	2023	2023
5	Park Suh-ho ^{AFA DC U13}	(South Korea)		(Singapore)	2025	Dec 2025
Midfielders
6	Tan Shaun Jin ^{U13}	(Singapore)		(Singapore)	2025	2025
13	Charlie Kay ^{U14}	(Singapore)		(Singapore)	2024	2025
17	Haziq Danial ^{U14}	(Singapore)		(Singapore)	2023	2024
19	Bryceton Pang ^{U14}	(Singapore)		(Singapore)	2024	2025
	Chae Tjer ^{AFA DC}	(Singapore)			2023	2023
	Raoul Lee-Harsha ^{AFA DC U13}	(Singapore)		(Singapore) BG Tampines Rovers U13	2025	2025
Strikers
14	Marcellus Kee Tng Chun ^{U14}	(Singapore)		(Singapore)	2024	2024
51	Andrew Tham Sheng Yong ^{U14}	(Singapore)		(Singapore)	2023	2024
43	Haqeem Mohd ^{U14}	(Singapore)		(Singapore)	2024	2024
50	Suren Roshan Mohan ^{U14}	(Singapore)		(Singapore)	2024	2024
10	Adib Arfah ^{AFA DC U14}	(Singapore)		(Singapore) Sailors Development Centre	2023	2024
26	Lee Seul Hong ^{AFA DC U14}	(South Korea)		(Singapore)	2024	2024
11	Toshiharu Hanzai ^{U13}	(Japan)		(Singapore)	2025	2025
3	Hugo Bouvard ^{U13}	(France)		(Singapore)	2025	2025
67	Raphael Courant ^{U13}	(France)		(Singapore)	2025	2025
52	Airell Nor Aidil ^{U13}	(Singapore)		(Singapore)	2025	2025
68	Aniq Aqish Alfee ^{U13}	(Singapore)		(Singapore)	2025	2025
93	Ciao Xandro Pancho Catubag ^{U13}	(Singapore)		(Singapore)	2025	2025
9	Thabo Jan Fredrick Gorgen ^{AFA DC U13}	(Germany)		(Singapore)	2024	2025
9	Royce Luke Kai Yuen ^{AFA DC U13}	(Singapore)		(Singapore) AFA DC U12	2025	2025
11	Ilmal Yaqin Fadzuhasny ^{AFA DC U13}	(Singapore)		(Singapore)	2024	2025
25	Toshiharu Anzai ^{AFA DC U13}	(Japan)		(Singapore)	2024	2025
78	Haruji Umeda ^{AFA DC U13}	(Japan)		(Singapore)	2024	2025
79	Eir'man Aqel Juraimi ^{AFA DC U13}	(Singapore)		(Singapore)	2024	2025
81	Luis Quintanilla Carillo ^{AFA DC U13}	(Colombia)		(Singapore)	2024	2025
84	Yuki Takahashi ^{AFA DC U13}	(Japan)		(Singapore)	2024	2025
85	Alexander Georg Schneeberger ^{AFA DC U13}	(Germany)		(Singapore)	2024	2025
88	Mika Asidq Fariheen ^{AFA DC U13}	(Singapore)		(Singapore)	2025	2025
91	Rifqi Hanif Hidzat ^{AFA DC U13}	(Singapore)		(Singapore)	2025	2025
19	Malikh Khairil ^{AFA DC U13}	(Singapore)		(Singapore)	2024	2024
94	Muhammad Afiq Danial ^{AFA DC U13}	(Singapore)		(Singapore) Geylang International U13	2024	2024
	Lucas Tok ^{U13}	(Singapore)		(Singapore)	2023	2024
	Low Kai Hean ^{AFA DC U13}	(Singapore)		(Singapore)		

=== U12 squad ===
Squad No.	Name	Nationality	Date of birth (age)	Previous club	Contract since	Contract end
Goalkeepers
Defenders
4	Fariel Nabil Fadzeel ^{AFA DC U12}	(Singapore)		(Singapore)	2025	2025
29	Wafi Khaliesh Amri ^{U12}	(Singapore)		(Singapore)	2024	2024
Midfielders
54	Lucas Chin ^{U12}	(Singapore)		(Singapore)	2024	2024
82	Kimi Raudzsus ^{U12}	(Germany)		(Singapore)	2024	2025
Forwards
8	Ilhan Nawfal Nazeer ^{AFA DC U12}	(Singapore)		(Singapore)	2024	2025
11	Ilman Hafidz Yazid ^{AFA DC U12}	(Singapore)		(Singapore)	2025	2025
25	Dan Fishman ^{AFA DC U12}	(Germany)		(Singapore)	2024	2024

== Transfers ==
=== In ===
Pre-season

Date	Position	Player	Transferred from	Ref.
U23
1 June 2025	DF	(Singapore) Marcus Mosses	(Singapore) Tanjong Pagar United U21	End of loan
1 June 2025	MF	(Singapore) Jonan Tan En Yuan	(Singapore) SAFSA	End of NS
1 June 2025	MF	(Singapore) Yasir Nizamudin	(Singapore) Hougang United U21	End of loan
1 June 2025	MF	(Singapore) Uvayn Kumar	(Singapore) Tanjong Pagar United U21	End of loan
1 June 2025	FW	(Singapore) Izrafil Yusof	(Singapore) Tanjong Pagar United U21	End of loan (Note: Izrafil moves to Young Lions on loan for new season.)
31 July 2025	MF	(Singapore) Nur Muhammad Asis	(Portugal) C.F. Estrela da Amadora (P1)	End of loan (Note: Asis loan with Estrela’s B Team ended and he moved to FC Vizela U23 on loan.)

=== Out ===
Preseason

Date	Position	Player	Transferred To	Ref.
U23
30 June 2025	MF	(Singapore) Uvayn Kumar	(Singapore)	Free
30 June 2025	MF	(Singapore) (England) (Japan) Ewan Seddon	(Singapore)	Free
30 June 2025	FW	(Singapore) Qaisy Noranzor	(Singapore)	Free
1 July 2025	DF	(Singapore) Marcus Mosses	(Singapore) Young Lions	Season loan
1 July 2025	DF	(Singapore) Aniq Raushan	(Singapore) Young Lions	Season loan
1 July 2025	DF	(Singapore) Iliya Naufal	(Singapore) Young Lions	Season loan
1 July 2025	DF	(Brazil) Enrico Walmrath Silveira	(Singapore) Young Lions	Season loan
1 July 2025	MF	(Singapore) Danie Hafiy	(Singapore) Young Lions	Season loan
1 July 2025	MF	(Singapore) Harith Danish Irwan	(Singapore) Young Lions	Season loan
1 July 2025	MF	(Portugal) Tiago Martins	(Singapore) Balestier Khalsa	Season loan
1 July 2025	FW	(England) Harry Spence	(Singapore) Young Lions	Season loan
1 July 2025	FW	(Singapore) (England) Ilyasin Zayan	(Singapore) Young Lions	Season loan
1 July 2025	FW	(Singapore) (Germany) Fernandez Casey Klein	(Singapore) Young Lions	Season loan
1 July 2025	FW	(Singapore) Izrafil Yusof	(Singapore) Young Lions	Season loan
2 July 2025	MF	(Singapore) Jonan Tan	(Portugal) FC Vizela U23 (P2)	Season loan till May 2026 (Note: Asis will primarily train and play with Estrela’s B Team, while also turning out for the club’s Under-23 side.)
1 August 2025	MF	(Singapore) Nur Muhammad Asis	(Portugal) FC Vizela U23 (P2)	Season loan till May 2026
13 August 2025	DF	(Singapore) Ilhan Rizqullah	(Singapore) Young Lions	Season loan
13 August 2025	MF	(Singapore) Sarrvin Raj	(Singapore) Young Lions	Season loan

=== Loan out ===
Preseason

Position	Player	Transferred to	Team	Ref
FW	(Singapore) (England) Ilyasin Zayan	(Singapore)	U21	On national service until December 2025
DF	(Singapore) Aniq Tiryaq	(Singapore) SAFSA	U21	On national service until April 2026
MF	(Singapore) Yazid Rais	(Singapore) SAFSA	U21	On national service until April 2026
FW	(Singapore) Qaisy Noranzor	(Singapore) SAFSA	U21	On national service until April 2026
GK	(Singapore) Issac Goh Jun Yang	(Singapore) SAFSA	U21	On national service until May 2026
DF	(Singapore) Kieran Aryan Azhari	(Singapore) SAFSA	U21	On national service until May 2026
MF	(Singapore) Caden Lim Zheng Yi	(Singapore) SAFSA	U21	On national service until May 2026
DF	(Singapore) Aqil Khusni	(Singapore) SAFSA	U21	On national service until July 2026
FW	(Singapore) (Nigeria) Uchenna Eziakor	(Spain) Rayo Ciudad Alcobendas Academy	U15	Season loan till May 20226
FW	(Singapore) (Iran) (England) Kian Ghadessy	(Singapore)	U21	On national service until October 2026
MF	(Singapore) Nathan Mao	(Singapore) SAFSA	U21	On national service until March 2027
DF	(Singapore) Muhammad Fadly	(Singapore) SAFSA	U21	On national service until April 2027
DF	(Singapore) Idzham Eszuan	(Singapore) SAFSA	U21	On national service until April 2027
DF	(Singapore) Harith Luth Harith	(Singapore) SAFSA	U21	On national service until April 2027

== Competition (SPL2) ==
=== Overall record ===
Competition	First match	Last match	Starting round	Record							
Competition	First match	Last match	Starting round	Pld	W	D	L	GF	GA	GD	Win %
Singapore Premier League 2	1 September 2025	21 April 2026	Matchday 1	0	0	0	0	0	0	+0	—
Total				0	0	0	0	0	0	+0	—

Last updated: pre-season
Source: Soccerway

==== League table ====
Pos	Team	Pld	W	D	L	GF	GA	GD	Pts	Qualification or relegation
1	Albirex Niigata (S) II	21	14	1	6	50	23	+27	43	Inaugural Champion
2	Young Lions B	21	13	1	7	52	31	+21	40	
3	BG Tampines Rovers II	21	12	2	7	46	30	+16	38	
4	Geylang International II	21	9	4	8	36	38	−2	31	
5	Tanjong Pagar United II	21	9	3	9	34	43	−9	30	
6	Lion City Sailors II	21	7	2	12	35	41	−6	23	
7	Hougang United II	21	5	4	12	28	43	−15	19	
8	Balestier Khalsa II	21	5	3	13	25	57	−32	18	

First match(es) will be played: 7 May 2026. Source: Singapore Premier League
Rules for classification: 1) points; 2) goal difference; 3) number of goals scored; 4) number of wins

==== Matches ====
Win Draw Loss

1 September 2025 1	Lion City Sailors (Singapore)	1–3	(Singapore) Tanjong Pagar United	Jurong East
				Stadium: Jurong East Stadium

10 September 2025 2	BG Tampines Rovers (Singapore)	2–1	(Singapore) Lion City Sailors	Tampines
				Stadium: Our Tampines Hub

29 September 2025 3	Lion City Sailors (Singapore)	–	(Singapore) Balestier Khalsa	Choa Chu Kang
				Stadium: Choa Chu Kang Stadium

7 October 2025 4	Hougang United (Singapore)	–	(Singapore) Lion City Sailors	Choa Chu Kang
				Stadium: Choa Chu Kang Stadium

15 October 2025 5	Lion City Sailors (Singapore)	–	(Singapore) Young Lions	Bishan
				Stadium: Bishan Stadium

29 October 2025 6	Lion City Sailors (Singapore)	–	(Japan) Albirex Niigata (S)	Bishan
				Stadium: Bishan Stadium

11 November 2025 7	Geylang International (Singapore)	–	(Singapore) Lion City Sailors	Tampines
				Stadium: Our Tampines Hub

17 November 2025 8	Tanjong Pagar United (Singapore)	–	(Singapore) Lion City Sailors	Jurong East
				Stadium: Jurong East Stadium

2 December 2025 9	Lion City Sailors (Singapore)	–	(Singapore) Geylang International	Bishan
				Stadium: Bishan Stadium

15 December 2025 10	Balestier Khalsa (Singapore)	–	(Singapore) Lion City Sailors	Bishan
				Stadium: Bishan Stadium

5 January 2026 11	Lion City Sailors (Singapore)	–	(Singapore) Hougang United	Bishan
				Stadium: Bishan Stadium

14 January 2026 12	Young Lions (Singapore)	–	(Singapore) Lion City Sailors	Jalan Besar
				Stadium: Jalan Besar Stadium

21 January 2026 13	Albirex Niigata (S) (Japan)	–	(Singapore) Lion City Sailors	Jurong East
				Stadium: Jurong East Stadium

27 January 2026 14	Lion City Sailors (Singapore)	–	(Singapore) BG Tampines Rovers	Bishan
				Stadium: Bishan Stadium

3 February 2026 15	Lion City Sailors (Singapore)	–	(Singapore) Tanjong Pagar United	Bishan
				Stadium: Bishan Stadium

24 February 2026 16	Geylang International (Singapore)	–	(Singapore) Lion City Sailors	Tampines
				Stadium: Our Tampines Hub

17 March 2026 17	Lion City Sailors (Singapore)	–	(Singapore) Balestier Khalsa	Bishan
				Stadium: Bishan Stadium

31 March 2026 18	Hougang United (Singapore)	–	(Singapore) Lion City Sailors	Jalan Besar
				Stadium: Jalan Besar Stadium

7 April 2026 19	Lion City Sailors (Singapore)	–	(Singapore) Young Lions	Bishan
				Stadium: Bishan Stadium

14 April 2026 20	Lion City Sailors (Singapore)	–	(Japan) Albirex Niigata (S)	Jurong East
				Stadium: Jurong East Stadium

21 April 2026 21	BG Tampines Rovers (Singapore)	–	(Singapore) Lion City Sailors	Tampines
				Stadium: Our Tampines Hub
