= CoinEx =

Defunct cryptocurrency exchange

- Type: Private
- Industry: Cryptocurrency
- Founded: December 2017; 8 years ago in Hong Kong
- Founder: Yang Haipo
- Headquarters: Hong Kong
- Website: www.coinex.com

CoinEx was a cryptocurrency exchange based in Hong Kong. Before shutting down its operations in 2026, it operated in Iran and facilitated transfers of more than US$3.8 billion in cryptocurrency linked to Iranian entities.

== History ==
CoinEx was founded in Hong Kong in December 2017 by Yang Haipo, a former Tencent engineer who had also founded the bitcoin mining pool ViaBTC.

In February 2023, the New York Attorney General sued CoinEx for failing to register with the state, and in June 2023 the exchange agreed to pay US$1.8 million and to be banned from operating in New York. In September 2023, hackers stole about US$70 million from CoinEx's hot wallets. The blockchain analytics firms Elliptic and Chainalysis linked the theft to North Korea, with Elliptic attributing it to the Lazarus Group.

In September 2026, CoinEx announced that it would cease operations on September 29 and that withdrawals would remain available until December 22, 2026. It also announced to buy back its CET tokens at 0.005 USDT each.

== Legal status ==
=== Iran ===
In early June 2026, the US Treasury's Office of Foreign Assets Control sanctioned four Iranian cryptocurrency exchanges, including Nobitex, the country's largest. It operated in Iran between 2019 and 2026 and facilitated transfers of more than US$3.8 billion in cryptocurrency linked to Iranian entities, about US$2.7 billion of which was connected to Nobitex. It was also alleged that part of the proceeds of the US$1.5 billion hack of Bybit had been moved to CoinEx through Iranian wallets.

=== Philippines ===
In August 2025, the telecommunications company PLDT blocked access to CoinEx on the orders of the National Telecommunications Commission, after the Securities and Exchange Commission deemed the platforms illegal for lack of registration.

=== South Korea ===
In March 2025, at the request of South Korea's Financial Intelligence Unit, Google blocked domestic access to the Google Play app of CoinEx, that was being used to serve South Korean users without license.

=== Thailand ===
In 2025, Securities and Exchange Commission of Thailand announced that CoinEx and four other unlicensed platforms would become inaccessible to users in Thailand from June 28, 2025.

=== United States ===
In February 2023, New York Attorney General Letitia James sued CoinEx, alleging that it had violated the Martin Act by failing to register with the state before buying and selling tokens such as AMP, LBRY, LUNA and Rally. In June 2023, CoinEx agreed, without admitting wrongdoing, to pay US$1.8 million, including US$1.17 million in refunds to 4,691 investors and a US$626,000 fine, and to be barred from doing business in New York or making its platform available there.
