= 2025–26 Singapore Premier League 2 =

Singapore Premier League 2
- Season: 2025–26
- Dates: 23 August 2025 – May 2026
- Champions: Albirex Niigata (S) II
- Top goalscorer: Tallo Ngao (13 goals)
- Biggest home win: Geylang 6–1 Balestier (21 Apr 2026)
- Biggest away win: Balestier 0–10 Albirex (S) (7 Oct 2025)
- Highest scoring: Balestier 0–10 Albirex (S) (7 Oct 2025)
- All statistics correct as of 13 May 2025.

The 2025–26 Singapore Premier League 2 was the inaugural season of the Singapore Premier League 2, the reserve league for the top-flight Singaporean association football clubs since the abolishment of the U21 league.

== Format ==
1. Clubs must now register a combined squad for both the SPL and reserve league (SPL2), with a minimum of 36 and a maximum of 50 players. At least 25 local players are to be registered.
2. Each club will play other 3 times in a season.
3. Clubs must field a minimum of six local players (including 4 U23) on the field at all time.

== Stadiums and locations ==
Locations of the 2024–25 Singapore Premier League teams from Singapore

Image	Team	Stadium	Capacity
	Albirex Niigata (S) II; Tanjong Pagar United II	Jurong East Stadium	2,700
	Lion City Sailors II; Balestier Khalsa II	Bishan Stadium	10,000
	Young Lions B Hougang United II	Jalan Besar Stadium	6,000
	Tampines Rovers II; Geylang International II	Our Tampines Hub	5,100
	Certain matches	Choa Chu Kang Stadium	4,268

== Personnel, kit and sponsoring ==
Note: Flags indicate national team as has been defined under FIFA eligibility rules. Players may hold more than one non-FIFA nationality.

Team	Head coach	Captain	Kit manufacturer	Main shirt sponsor
Albirex Niigata (S) II	(Singapore) Jaswinder Singh		(Spain) Kelme	
Balestier Khalsa II	(Singapore) Indra Sahdan		(Germany) Adidas	(Singapore) Komoco
BG Tampines Rovers II	(Japan) Kosei Nakamura		(Thailand) Warrix	(Thailand) BG
Geylang International II	(Singapore) Nor Azli Yusoff		(Thailand) FBT	(Singapore) Vector Green
Hougang United II	(Thailand) Pannarai Pansiri (till 28 Oct) (Singapore) (Tunisia) Walid Lounis		(Thailand) Volt	(Japan) Supercharge (Japan) Daikin
Lion City Sailors II	(Singapore) Jasni Hatta		(Germany) Adidas	(Singapore) SEA (Singapore) Shopee (Continental)
Tanjong Pagar United II	(Singapore) Jaslee Hatta		(Denmark) Hummel	(Singapore) Adactive Asia
Young Lions B	(Singapore) Syed Azmi	(Singapore)	(United States) Nike	(China) Dongfeng

== Results ==
=== League table ===
Pos	Team	Pld	W	D	L	GF	GA	GD	Pts	Qualification or relegation
1	Albirex Niigata (S) II	21	14	1	6	50	23	+27	43	Inaugural Champion
2	Young Lions B	21	13	1	7	52	31	+21	40	
3	BG Tampines Rovers II	21	12	2	7	46	30	+16	38	
4	Geylang International II	21	9	4	8	36	38	−2	31	
5	Tanjong Pagar United II	21	9	3	9	34	43	−9	30	
6	Lion City Sailors II	21	7	2	12	35	41	−6	23	
7	Hougang United II	21	5	4	12	28	43	−15	19	
8	Balestier Khalsa II	21	5	3	13	25	57	−32	18	

First match(es) will be played: 7 May 2026. Source: Singapore Premier League
Rules for classification: 1) points; 2) goal difference; 3) number of goals scored; 4) number of wins

=== Result summary ===
Teams	ALB	BAL	BGT	GEY	HOU	LCS	TPU	YLI
Albirex Niigata (S) II		2–0	0–1	4–1	3–0	2–1	2–0	4–0
Albirex Niigata (S) II			1–3		4–1			2–1
Balestier Khalsa II	0–10		2–1	0–2	3–1	0–5	3–4	0–4
Balestier Khalsa II	0–1				1–1		1–1	0–2
BG Tampines Rovers II	2–2	1–0		1–1	3–0; Awarded (Note: BG Tampines Rovers v Hougang United, originally won 1–0 by Hougang United, was forfeited and awarded 3–0 to BG Tampines by the AFC Disciplinary Committee on 3 March 2026, as Hougang United fielded Gloire Amanda, even though he has not completed the required regulatory clearances relating to his work pass status.)	2–1	1–3	2–3
BG Tampines Rovers II		5–2		1–2		1–2		
Geylang International II	1–0	3–1	1–2		1–1	2–1	3–1	1–0
Geylang International II		6–1	0–7			2–1		
Hougang United II	5–2	2–3	0–2	1–1		2–2	0–2	0–2
Hougang United II			0–1	1–4		2–1		2–3
Lion City Sailors II	0–2	1–1	3–2	2–1	2–3		1–3	1–0
Lion City Sailors II	2–0	1–4					2–3	2–5
Tanjong Pagar United II	0–3	0–3; Awarded (Note: The match, originally won by Tanjong Pagar 2-0, was forfeited by Tanjong Pagar and awarded 3–0 to Balestier Khalsa, as Tanjong Pagar fielded less than 4 U23 Singaporeans)	4–3	2–0	0–3	4–2		1–5
Tanjong Pagar United II	0–2			1–1	2–1			
Young Lions B	4–1	3–0	4–2	6–3	1–2	0–2	3–1	
Young Lions B			1–2	3–1			2–2	

Updated to match(es) played on 7 May 2026. Source: spl.sg
Legend: Blue = left column team win; Yellow = draw; Red = top row team win.
For upcoming matches, an "a" indicates there is an article about the rivalry between the two participants.

=== Fixtures and results ===
==== Round 1 ====
1 September 2025	Hougang United (Singapore)	1–1	(Singapore) Geylang International	Tampines
	Settawut Wongsai 60'; G.Sheeva (yellow card) 1'; Isaac Lee (red card) 6'; Adam Ali (yellow card) 16'; Khilfi Aniq (yellow card) 85'		Irfan Iskandar 68'	Stadium: Our Tampines Hub; Referee: Khairul Amri

1 September 2025	Lion City Sailors (Singapore)	1–3	(Singapore) Tanjong Pagar United	Jurong East
	Naufal Azman 88'; Aaryan Fikri (yellow card) 70' (yellow-red card) 74'; Faisal Shahril (yellow card) 28'		Sahil Suhaimi 4'; Syahrul Sazali 81'; Guilherme Rodrigues 83'; Azim Akbar (yellow card) 64'; Fathullah Rahmat (yellow card) 90'	Stadium: Jurong East Stadium; Referee: Andrea Verolino

9 December 2025 Rescheduled	Balestier Khalsa (Singapore)	0–4	(Singapore) Young Lions	Bishan
	Daniyal Lynn Rasor (red card) 45'; Karthigaya Varmaan (yellow card) 54'		Aqil M. Khusni 36'; Ilyasin Zayan 45'; Garv Sahoo 48', 90'; Iliya Naufal Idris (yellow card) 45'; Zaki Jumlan (yellow card) 65'; Lukyan Tan (yellow card) 83'; Marcus Mosses (yellow card) 85'	Stadium: Bishan Stadium; Referee: Yazid Abdul Latiff

22 December 2025 Rescheduled	Albirex Niigata (S) (Japan)	0–1	(Singapore) BG Tampines Rovers	Jurong East
	Liska Iskandar (yellow card) 75'; Delwinder Singh (yellow card) 90'; Jaden Heng (yellow card) 90+5'		Witthawat Phraothaisong 5' (yellow card) 78'; Matthias Koesno (yellow card) 90+5'; Kegan Phant (yellow card) 90+5'	Stadium: Jurong East Stadium; Referee: Mazlan Pagira

==== Round 2 ====
9 September 2025	Geylang International (Singapore)	3–1	(Singapore) Balestier Khalsa	Choa Chu Kang
	Adam Irfan 51'; Syafi Suhaimi 58'; Shafeeq Ameer 75'; Nur Ikhsanuddin (yellow card) 32'		Elijah Lim Teck Yong 11'; Yanir Ben Eliezer (yellow card) 32'; Daniyal Lynn Rasor (yellow card) 42'	Stadium: Choa Chu Kang Stadium; Referee: Farhad Mohamed

9 September 2025	Tanjong Pagar United (Singapore)	0–3	(Singapore) Hougang United	Jurong East
	Risvi Aaqil (yellow card) 12'; Farid Jafiri (yellow card) 89'		Hugo Kametani 53', 61'; Settawut Wongsai 75'; Kanok Kongsimma (yellow card) 38'; Huzaifah Aziz (yellow card) 46'; Chonlawit Kanuengkid (yellow card) 89'	Stadium: Jurong East Stadium; Referee: Mazlan Pagira

10 September 2025	BG Tampines Rovers (Singapore)	2–1	(Singapore) Lion City Sailors	Tampines
	Faris Ramli 32'; Tallo Ngao 78'		Namsang Rai 70'; Faisal Shahril (yellow card) 68'	Stadium: Our Tampines Hub; Referee: Muhammad Zulfiqar

23 September 2025 Rescheduled	Albirex Niigata (S) (Japan)	4–0	(Singapore) Young Lions	Jurong East
	Helmi Shahrol 45'; Jaden Heng 47'; Syukri Bashir 59'; Soshi Kadowaki 70'; Sim Jun Yen (yellow card) 18'		Ikram Mikhail Mustaqim (yellow card) 43'; Yazid Rais (yellow card) 74'	Stadium: Jurong East Stadium; Referee: Aldrick Lee

==== Round 3 ====
29 September 2025	BG Tampines Rovers (Singapore)	1–3	(Singapore) Tanjong Pagar United	Jurong East
	Kegan Phang 55'; Witthawat Phraothaisong (yellow card) 57'		Risvi Aaqil 10', 15', 30'; Emmeric Ong (yellow card) 44'; Aloysius Pang (yellow card) 56'; Syahrul Sazali (yellow card) 90+4'	Stadium: Jurong East Stadium; Referee: Taufik Thana

29 September 2025	Lion City Sailors (Singapore)	1–1	(Singapore) Balestier Khalsa	Choa Chu Kang
	Ahmad Danial 42'; Faisal Shahril (yellow card) 90'		Ifat Sha'aban 70' (pen.); Adly Irfan (yellow card) 57'; Syafi Hilman (yellow card) 84'	Stadium: Choa Chu Kang Stadium; Referee: Syarqawi Buhari

30 September 2025	Albirex Niigata (S) (Japan)	4–1	(Singapore) Geylang International	Jurong East
	Lee Dong-yeol 19', 31'; Jaden Heng 41', 58'; Dylan Pereira (yellow card) 55'; Danish Qayyum (yellow card) 74'; Aneeq Fairus (red card) 84'		Gareth Low 45' (yellow card) 65'; Shaquille Danish (yellow card) 82'	Stadium: Jurong East Stadium; Referee: Thawfeek Ahamad

30 September 2025	Hougang United (Singapore)	0–2	(Singapore) Young Lions	Choa Chu Kang
	Rauf Sanizal (yellow card) 28'; Khilfi Aniq (yellow card) 50'; Yuta Kikuchi (yellow card) 55'; Chun Wei Woo (yellow card) 90+4'		Iliya Naufal Idris 59' (yellow card) 32'; Ilyasin Zayan 85'	Stadium: Choa Chu Kang Stadium; Referee: Yazid Abdul Latiff

==== Round 4 ====
6 October 2025	Hougang United (Singapore)	2–2	(Singapore) Lion City Sailors	Choa Chu Kang
	Hugo Kametani 14'; Haiqal Pashia 79'; Víctor Blasco (yellow card) 58'; Rishon Soroya (yellow card) 67'		Abdul Rasaq 16', 85'; Adam Faisal (yellow card) 28'; Zulqarnaen Suzliman (yellow card) 55'; Danish Irfan Azman (yellow card) 82'	Stadium: Choa Chu Kang Stadium; Referee: Aldrick Lee

7 October 2025	Balestier Khalsa (Singapore)	0–10	(Japan) Albirex Niigata (S)	Jurong East
	Nor Irfan (yellow card) 88'		Danish Qayyum 1'; Helmi Shahrol 14', 51' (yellow card) 43'; Syed Firdaus 28', 53'; Amy Recha 54', 67' (pen.), 69'; Liska Iskandar 59'; Soshi Kadowaki 83'; Nicky Melvin Singh (yellow card) 85'	Stadium: Jurong East Stadium; Referee: Clarence Leow

4 November 2025 Rescheduled	Young Lions (Singapore)	3–1	(Singapore) Tanjong Pagar United	Jurong East
	Sérgio Mendonça 21', 59'; Nicolas Benninger 68'; Sahil Suhaimi (yellow card) 52'; Danish Haqimi (yellow card) 87'		Naufal Ilham 11'; Joilson (yellow card) 66'; Enrico Walmrath (yellow card) 78'	Stadium: Jurong East Stadium; Referee: Aldrick Lee

2 March 2026 Rescheduled	Geylang International (Singapore)	1–2	(Singapore) BG Tampines Rovers	Tampines
	Timothy Cheng 51' (pen.); Danial Scott Crichton (yellow card) 39'; Raiyan Noor (yellow card) 59'		Marc Ryan Tan 37'; Qylfie Ryan 79'; Caden Lim (yellow card) 43'; Matthias Koesno (yellow card) 85' (yellow-red card) 90'	Stadium: Our Tampines Hub; Referee: Oswind Suriya

==== Round 5 ====
13 October 2025	Albirex Niigata (S) (Japan)	3–0	(Singapore) Hougang United	Jurong East
	Nicky Melvin Singh 67', 71'; Sim Jun Yen 90' (yellow card) 88'		Syady Sufwan (yellow card) 45+2'; Adam Ali (yellow card) 48'	Stadium: Jurong East Stadium; Referee: Taufik Thana

14 October 2025	Tanjong Pagar United (Singapore)	2–0	(Singapore) Geylang International	Jurong East
	Aymeric Ngankam 1' (yellow card) 25'; Sahil Suhaimi 14'; Naufal Ilham (yellow card) 47'; Bruno Dybal (yellow card) 68'; Danny Ali (yellow card) 86'		Gareth Low (yellow card) 62'; Syafi Suhaimi (yellow card) 74'	Stadium: Jurong East Stadium; Referee: Muhammad Zulfiqar

15 October 2025	BG Tampines Rovers (Singapore)	1–0	(Singapore) Balestier Khalsa	Tampines
	Tallo Ngao 18'; Liam Buckley (yellow card) 59'; Shaddiq Mansor (yellow card) 73'			Stadium: Our Tampines Hub; Referee: Yazid Abdul Latiff

15 October 2025	Lion City Sailors (Singapore)	1–0	(Singapore) Young Lions	Bishan
	Abdul Rasaq 28'; Naufal Azman (yellow card) 72'; Aiman Zayani (yellow card) 76'; Nur Adam Abdullah (yellow card) 82'; Zulqarnaen Suzliman (yellow card) 88'		Marcus Mosses (yellow card) 90'	Stadium: Bishan Stadium; Referee: Mazlan Pagira

==== Round 6 ====
28 October 2025	Balestier Khalsa (Singapore)	3–4	(Singapore) Tanjong Pagar United	Bishan
	Ifat Sha'aban 55', 67', 90'; Karthigaya Varmaan (yellow card) 29'		Emilio Estevez 18'; Sahil Suhaimi 24' (yellow card) 90+9'; Fathullah Rahmat 66' (yellow card) 90+9'; Shodai Nishikawa 90'; Aloysius Pang (yellow card) 83'	Stadium: Bishan Stadium; Referee: Khairul Amri

28 October 2025	Young Lions (Singapore)	6–3	(Singapore) Geylang International	Tampines
	Danie Hafiy 5'; Garv Sahoo 18'; Nicolas Benninger 45'; Caelan Cheong 51'; Iliya Naufal Idris 59'; Iqram Rifqi 83' (o.g.); Ryan Vishal (yellow card) 23'; Ikram Mikhail Mustaqim (yellow card) 33'; Luth Harith Fathi (yellow card) 63'; Yazid Rais (yellow card) 78'; Muhammad Fadly (yellow card) 85'		Gareth Low 66' (pen.), 76' (yellow card) 81'; Tajeli Salamat 70'; Ryu Hardy (yellow card) 48'; Raiyan Noor (yellow card) 80'	Stadium: Our Tampines Hub; Referee: Noor Adzdzeeq

29 October 2025	Hougang United (Singapore)	0–2	(Singapore) BG Tampines Rovers	Choa Chu Kang
	Rauf Sanizal (yellow card) 12'; Adam Ali (yellow card) 65'; Ganesan Silloren (red card) 76'; Syady Sufwan (yellow card) 82'		Shafrel Ariel 27'; Tallo Ngao 62'; Kegan Phang (yellow card) 76'	Stadium: Choa Chu Kang Stadium; Referee: Thawfeek Ahamad

29 October 2025	Lion City Sailors (Singapore)	0–2	(Japan) Albirex Niigata (S)	Bishan
			Aneeq Fairus 14'; Soshi Kadowaki 87'; Akmal Azman (yellow card) 90'	Stadium: Bishan Stadium; Referee: Ahmad A'Qashah

==== Round 7 ====
10 November 2025	Young Lions (Singapore)	4–2	(Singapore) BG Tampines Rovers	Bishan
	Nicolas Benninger 68'; Shafrel Ariel 75' (o.g.); Abner Vinicius 78' (yellow card) 58'; Sérgio Mendonça 80'; Ikram Mikhail Mustaqim (yellow card) 83'		Tallo Ngao 42', 47'; Sky Yeo (yellow card) 60'; Shafrel Ariel (yellow card) 63'; Nalawich Inthacharoen (yellow card) 66'; Kegan Phang (yellow card) 70'	Stadium: Bishan Stadium; Referee: Khairul Amri

10 November 2025	Tanjong Pagar United (Singapore)	0–3	(Japan) Albirex Niigata (S)	Jurong East
			Sim Jun Yen 75'; Jaden Heng 83'; Helmi Shahrol 90'	Stadium: Jurong East Stadium; Referee: Taufik Thana

11 November 2025	Geylang International (Singapore)	2–1	(Singapore) Lion City Sailors	Tampines
	Raiyan Noor 20', 83'; Shaquille Danish (yellow card) 90+2'		Naufal Azman 19'; Yasir Nizamudin (yellow card) 64'; Namsang Rai (yellow card) 88'	Stadium: Our Tampines Hub; Referee: Yazid Abdul Latiff

11 November 2025	Balestier Khalsa (Singapore)	3–1	(Singapore) Hougang United	Bishan
	Tiago Martins 33', 41'; Karthigaya Varmaan 70'		Syady Sufwan 9'; Adam Ali (yellow card) 81'	Stadium: Bishan Stadium; Referee: Andrea Verolino

==== Round 8 ====
17 November 2025	Tanjong Pagar United (Singapore)	4–2	(Singapore) Lion City Sailors	Jurong East
	Aaron Evans 9'; Bruno Dybal 50'; Youssef Ezzejjari 55'; Lee Hyun-sub 81'; Aloysius Pang (yellow card) 72'		Yasir Nizamudin 65'; Ikmal Hazlan 90'	Stadium: Jurong East Stadium; Referee: Muhammad Zulfiqar

17 November 2025	Young Lions (Singapore)	3–0	(Singapore) Balestier Khalsa	Bishan
	Jovan Ang 18' (yellow card) 47'; Nicolas Benninger 79' (yellow card) 82'; Yazid Rais 90'; Idzham Eszuan (yellow card) 90'		Karthigaya Varmaan (yellow card) 57'; Adly Irfan (yellow card) 74'	Stadium: Bishan Stadium; Referee: Taufik Thana

18 November 2025	BG Tampines Rovers (Singapore)	2–2	(Japan) Albirex Niigata (S)	Jurong East
	Witthawat Phraothaisong 26'; Zikos Vasileios Chua 64' (yellow card) 71'; Matthias Koesno (yellow card) 89'		Amy Recha 45'; Syukri Bashir 87'; Aqil Zafri (yellow card) 25'; Khaalish Aaqil (yellow card) 41'; Liska Iskandar (yellow card) 90'	Stadium: Jurong East Stadium; Referee: Noor Adzdzeeq

18 November 2025	Geylang International (Singapore)	1–1	(Singapore) Hougang United	Tampines
	Ryu Hardy Yussri 16' (yellow card) 22'; Irfan Iskandar (yellow card) 55'; Sho Gamo (yellow card) 88'; Nizwan Izzairie (yellow card) 90'		Matin Manaf 71' (yellow card) 76'; Rishon Soroya (yellow card) 59'	Stadium: Our Tampines Hub; Referee: Mazlan Pagira

==== Round 9 ====
4 December 2025 Rescheduled	BG Tampines Rovers (Singapore)	2–3	(Singapore) Young Lions	Tampines
	Tallo Ngao 26', 37'; Kegan Phang (yellow card) 45'; Witthawat Phraothaisong (yellow card) 52'; Ilham Iskandar (yellow card) 65'; Shaddiq Mansor (yellow card) 90'		Ilyasin Zayan 66' (pen.); Loo Kai Sheng 74'; Syazwan Latiff 87'; Iliya Naufal Idris (yellow card) 24'; Marcus Mosses (yellow card) 30'; Muhammad Fadly (yellow card) 69'	Stadium: Our Tampines Hub; Referee: Thawfeek Ahamad

2 December 2025	Lion City Sailors (Singapore)	2–1	(Singapore) Geylang International	Bishan
	Akmal Azman 35'; Namsang Rai 77'; Danish Irfan Azman (yellow card) 53'		Prince Rio Rifae'i 25'; Ryu Hardy (yellow card) 45'; Ethan Pinto (yellow card) 49'; Nur Ikhsanuddin (yellow card) 52'	Stadium: Bishan Stadium; Referee: Farhad Mohamed

3 December 2025	Hougang United (Singapore)	2–3	(Singapore) Balestier Khalsa	Bishan
	Yuma Suwa 80', 90'; Rishon Soroya (yellow card) 90'		Ifat Sha'aban 25', 65'; Harris Ilhan 69'; Karthigaya Varmaan (yellow card) 22'; Firdaus Roslan (yellow card) 82'	Stadium: Bishan Stadium; Referee: Taufik Thana

3 December 2025	Albirex Niigata (S) (Japan)	2–0	(Singapore) Tanjong Pagar United	Jurong East
	Helmi Shahrol 46'; Ren Nishimura 73'; Aqil Zafri (yellow card) 58'; Aneeq Fairus (yellow card) 61'; Syed Firdaus Hassan (yellow card) 68'		Danish Haqimi (yellow card) 59'	Stadium: Jurong East Stadium; Referee: Oswind Suriya

==== Round 10 ====
15 December 2025	Tanjong Pagar United (Singapore)	4–3	(Singapore) BG Tampines Rovers	Jurong East
	Youssef Ezzejjari 20', 36', 52', 65'; Erfan Azhar (yellow card) 29'; Danish Haqimi (yellow card) 82'; Samuel Pillai (yellow card) 90'		Zikos Chua 23'; Talla Ndao 30', 89'	Stadium: Jurong East Stadium; Referee: Taufik Thana

15 December 2025	Balestier Khalsa (Singapore)	0–5	(Singapore) Lion City Sailors	Bishan
	Syabil Hisham (yellow card) 56'		Ahmad Danial 19'; Lin Ze hao 58' (o.g.); Adam Faisal 85'; Ikmal Hazlan 89'; Aiman Zayani 90+2'; Aaryan Fikri (yellow card) 36'	Stadium: Bishan Stadium; Referee: Muhammad Noor Adzdzeeq

13 November 2025 Rescheduled	Young Lions (Singapore)	1–2	(Singapore) Hougang United	Tampines
	Iliya Naufal Idris 11'; Casey Klein (yellow card) 34'; Ikram Mikhail Mustaqim (yellow card) 55'; Idzham Eszuan (yellow card) 81'; Ryan Vishal (yellow card) 89'		Farhan Sahlan 9'; Khilfi Aniq 41' (yellow card) 57'; Brant Tan (yellow card) 42'	Stadium: Our Tampines Hub; Referee: Jansen Foo

16 December 2025	Geylang International (Singapore)	1–0	(Japan) Albirex Niigata (S)	Jurong East
	Shuhei Hoshino 60'; Joshua Pereira (yellow card) 6'; Ryoya Taniguchi (yellow card) 73'		Jaden Heng (yellow card) 32'; Syukri Bashir (yellow card) 44'; Aqil Zafri (yellow card) 50'	Stadium: Jurong East Stadium; Referee: Khairul Amri

==== Round 11 ====
10 February 2026 Rescheduled	Tanjong Pagar United (Singapore)	1–5	(Singapore) Young Lions	Jurong East
	Darius Lai 30'; Haziq Zulkifli (yellow card) 67'; Fathullah Rahmat (yellow card) 82'		Caelan Cheong 21'; Harith Danish Irwan 56', 69'; Nicolas Beninger 61'; Zaki Jumlan 88'	Stadium: Jurong East Stadium; Referee: Faris Abdul Rahman

5 January 2026	Lion City Sailors (Singapore)	2–3	(Singapore) Hougang United	Bishan
	Namsang Rai 45'; Ikmal Hazlan 59' (yellow card) 77'; Adam Faisal (yellow card) 44'		Chonlawit Kanuengkid 38'; Syady Sufwan 71' (pen.); Khilfi Aniq 89'; Kanok Kongsimma (yellow card) 48'; Brant Tan (yellow card) 74'; G. Jeeva (yellow card) 90'	Stadium: Bishan Stadium; Referee: Aldrick Lee

6 January 2026	BG Tampines Rovers (Singapore)	1–1	(Singapore) Geylang International	Tampines
	Faris Ramli 18'; Caden Lim (yellow card) 24'; Lim Zheng Wu (yellow card) 88'		Amy Recha 53'; Ryu Hardy (yellow card) 8'; Prince Rio Rifae'i (yellow card) 26'	Stadium: Our Tampines Hub; Referee: Khairul Amri

6 January 2026	Albirex Niigata (S) (Japan)	2–0	(Singapore) Balestier Khalsa	Jurong East
	Ren Nishimura 26'; Shakthi Vinayagavijayan 90'; Komei Iida (yellow card) 50'		Zamani Zamri (yellow card) 40'; Fudhil I'yadh (yellow card) 86'; Ifat Sha'aban (yellow card) 90'	Stadium: Jurong East Stadium; Referee: Noor Adzdzeeq

==== Round 12 ====
13 January 2026	Geylang International (Singapore)	3-1	(Singapore) Tanjong Pagar United	Tampines
	Prince Rio Rifae'i 19', 26'; Timothy Cheng 52'; Danial Scott Crichton (yellow card) 31'; Danie Hafiy (yellow card) 42'; Shakir Hamzah (yellow card) 45'; Faisal Shahril (yellow card) 75'		Naqiuddin Eunos 75'	Stadium: Our Tampines Hub; Referee: Noor Adzdzeeq

13 January 2026	Young Lions (Singapore)	0–2	(Singapore) Lion City Sailors	Jalan Besar
	Marcus Mosses (red card) 45'		Ahmad Danial 82'; Ikmal Hazlan 90'	Stadium: Jalan Besar Stadium; Referee: Syarqawi Buhari

14 January 2026	Hougang United (Singapore)	5–2	(Japan) Albirex Niigata (S)	Jurong East
	Jaushua Sotirio 10'; Washington Jaramillo 57', 62'; Farhan Zulkifli 73'; Settawut Wongsai 83'; Anders Aplin (yellow card) 28'; Jordan Vestering (yellow card) 66'		Ryaan Sanizal 50' (o.g.); Liska Iskandar 90'; Soshi Kadowaki (yellow card) 22'; Jaden Heng (yellow card) 61'	Stadium: Jurong East Stadium; Referee: Sahmadi Nawawi

14 January 2026	Balestier Khalsa (Singapore)	2–1	(Singapore) BG Tampines Rovers	Bishan
	Karthigaya Varmaan 22'; Ifat Sha'aban 84'; Zamani Zamri (yellow card) 53'; Irfan Iskandar (yellow card) 86'; Martyn Mun (yellow card) 90'		Lim Zheng Wu 37'	Stadium: Bishan Stadium; Referee: Faris Abdul Rahman

==== Round 13 ====
20 January 2026	Geylang International (Singapore)	1–0	(Singapore) Young Lions	Tampines
	Iqram Rifqi 73'; Aniq Martin (yellow card) 42'; Danial Scott Crichton (yellow card) 90'		Levi Farris (yellow card) 71'	Stadium: Our Tampines Hub; Referee: Thawfeek Ahamad

20 January 2026	Tanjong Pagar United (Singapore)	0–3; Awarded (Note: The match, originally won by Tanjong Pagar 2-0, was forfeited by Tanjong Pagar and awarded 3–0 to Balestier Khalsa, as Tanjong Pagar fielded less than 4 U23 Singaporeans)	(Singapore) Balestier Khalsa	Jurong East
	Syabil Hisham 27' (o.g.); Sahil Suhaimi 45'; Shodai Nishikawa (yellow card) 34' (yellow-red card); Samuel Pillai (yellow card) 36'; Azim Akbar (yellow card) 52'		Syabil Hisham (yellow card) 62'; Fudhil I'yadh (yellow card) 85' (yellow-red card); Ifat Sha'aban (yellow card) 90+1'	Stadium: Jurong East Stadium; Referee: Mazlan Pagira

21 January 2026	Albirex Niigata (S) (Japan)	2–1	(Singapore) Lion City Sailors	Jurong East
	Ryang Hyon-ju 4'; Soshi Kadowaki 90+2'; Aqil Zafri (yellow card) 36'		Namsang Rai 74'; Yasir Nizamudin (yellow card) 41'	Stadium: Jurong East Stadium; Referee: Yazid Abdul Latiff

21 January 2026	BG Tampines Rovers (Singapore)	3–0; Awarded (Note: BG Tampines Rovers v Hougang United, originally won 1–0 by Hougang United, was forfeited and awarded 3–0 to BG Tampines by the FAS Disciplinary Committee on 3 March 2026, as Hougang United fielded Gloire Amanda, even though he has not completed the required regulatory clearances relating to his work pass status.)	(Singapore) Hougang United	Bishan
	Zheng Wu Lim (yellow card) 88'		Chonlawit Kanuengkid 38'; Kanok Kongsimma (yellow card) 58'; Parinya Nusong (yellow card) 67'	Stadium: Bishan Stadium; Referee: Oswind Suriya

==== Round 14 ====
28 April 2026 Rescheduled	Lion City Sailors (Singapore)	3–2	(Singapore) BG Tampines Rovers	Bishan
	Ahmad Danial 6', 58'; Raiyan Izdihar 42'; Aaryan Fikri (yellow card) 65'; Namsang Rai (yellow card) 75'		Zikos Chua 2'; Talla Ndao 75'; Ong Yu En (yellow card) 48'; Adly Nufail (yellow card) 90+3'	Stadium: Bishan Stadium; Referee: Oswind Suriya

27 January 2026	Balestier Khalsa (Singapore)	0–2	(Singapore) Geylang International	Tampines
	Larry Lim (yellow card) 58'; Zamani Zamri (yellow card) 65'		Timothy Cheng 45'; Pathyn Banesh 90'; Gareth Low (yellow card) 69'	Stadium: Our Tampines Hub; Referee: Noor Adzdzeeq

27 January 2026	Hougang United (Singapore)	0–2	(Singapore) Tanjong Pagar United	Jurong East
	Matin Manaf (yellow card) 13'; Nasrul Pujiyono (yellow card) 35'; Algirdas Karlonas (yellow card) 45'; G. Jeeva (yellow card) 85'; Khilfi Aniq (yellow card) 90'		Sahil Suhaimi 2', 28'; Guilherme Rodrigues (yellow card) 75'	Stadium: Jurong East Stadium; Referee: Yazid Abdul Latiff

27 January 2026	Young Lions (Singapore)	4–1	(Japan) Albirex Niigata (S)	Jalan Besar
	Rauf Anaqi 24'; Nicolas Beninger 51'; Ajay Robson 60'; Lukyan Tan Ye Yi 80'; Loo Kai Sheng (yellow card) 56'		Ahmad Martin 67'; Khaalish Aaqil (yellow card) 33' (yellow-red card); Jaden Heng (yellow card) 62'; Danish Qayyum (yellow card) 76'	Stadium: Jalan Besar Stadium; Referee: Faris Abdul Rahman

==== Round 15 ====
7 May 2026 (Rescheduled)	Albirex Niigata (S) (Japan)	1–3	(Singapore) BG Tampines Rovers	Jurong East
	Hilmi Shahrol 74'; Syukri Bashir (yellow card) 32'; Danish Qayyum (yellow card) 43'; Aydin Zufayri (yellow card) 65'		Lim Zheng Wu 9'; Taufik Surpano 42'; Zikos Chua 68'; Iman Hakim (yellow card) 89'	Stadium: Jurong East Stadium; Referee: Hilmi Fuad

3 February 2026	Balestier Khalsa (Singapore)	0–2	(Singapore) Young Lions	Jalan Besar
	Saf Loqmen (yellow card) 33'; Irfan Iskandar (yellow card) 45' (yellow-red card) 82'; Aqil Dany (yellow card) 86'; Karthigaya Varmaan (yellow card) 90'		Kian Ghadessy 79' (pen.), 90'; Ryan Vishal (yellow card) 65' (yellow-red card) 72'; Ajay Robson (yellow card) 67' (yellow-red card) 69'	Stadium: Jalan Besar Stadium; Referee: Khairul Amri

3 February 2026	Hougang United (Singapore)	1–4	(Singapore) Geylang International	Tampines
	Nasrul Pujiyono 36'; Farhan Sahlan (yellow card) 45'; Syady Sufwan (yellow card) 63'; Kanok Kongsimma (yellow card) 89'		Timothy Cheng 6', 50'; Prince Rio Rifae'i 66'; Abdusukur Abduryim 68'; Ryu Hardy (yellow card) 33'; Faisal Shahril (yellow card) 65'; Pathyn Banesh (yellow card) 80'	Stadium: Our Tampines Hub; Referee: Faris Abdul Rahman

3 February 2026	Lion City Sailors (Singapore)	2–3	(Singapore) Tanjong Pagar United	Bishan
	Adam Faisal 32'; Aiman Zayani 82' (yellow card) 75'		Naqiuddin Eunos 17', 36'; Faisal Roslan 90'; Haziq Zulkifli (yellow card) 65'	Stadium: Bishan Stadium

==== Round 16 ====
24 February 2026	Tanjong Pagar United (Singapore)	0–2	(Japan) Albirex Niigata (S)	Jurong East
	Aiqel Aliman (yellow card) 63'; Syahadat Masnawi (yellow card) 70'; Azim Akbar (yellow card) 75'		Helmi Shahrol 48'; Liska Iskandar 88' (yellow card) 90'; Nicky Melvin Singh (yellow card) 34'; Sim Jun Yen (yellow card) 38'; Daniel Martens (yellow card) 65'	Stadium: Jurong East Stadium; Referee: Thawfeek Ahamad

24 February 2026	Young Lions (Singapore)	1–2	(Singapore) BG Tampines Rovers	Jalan Besar
	Garv Sahoo 65'; Caelan Cheong (yellow card) 48'; Ryan Vishal (yellow card) 58'; Ayden Syaifuallah (yellow card) 90'		Anton Goh 63'; Caden Lim 76'; Shafrel Ariel (yellow card) 26'; Liam Buckley (yellow card) 44'; Ong Yu En (yellow card) 45+2'; Zeeshan Iskandar (yellow card) 88'; Rae Peh (yellow card) 90+3'	Stadium: Jalan Besar Stadium; Referee: Noor Adzdzeeq

24 February 2026	Balestier Khalsa (Singapore)	1–1	(Singapore) Hougang United	Bishan
	Hugh Alexander Lobsey 88'; Dany Irfan (yellow card) 55'; Syafi Hilman (yellow card) 60'; Aniq Raushan (yellow card) 82'		Saharat Panmarchya 54'; Parinya Nusong (yellow card) 43'; Chun Wei Woo (yellow card) 82'; Aryan Boon (yellow card) 85'; Syady Sufwan (yellow card) 87'	Stadium: Bishan Stadium; Referee: Yazid Abdul Latiff

24 February 2026	Geylang International (Singapore)	2–1	(Singapore) Lion City Sailors	Tampines
	Timothy Cheng 7', 54'; Sho Gamo (yellow card) 51'; Andry Akimi (yellow card) 90'		Ahmad Danial 21'; Nur Adam Abdulla (yellow card) 61'; Ikmal Hazlan (yellow card) 71'	Stadium: Our Tampines Hub; Referee: Hilmi Fuad

==== Round 17 ====
17 March 2026	Albirex Niigata (S) (Japan)	2–1	(Singapore) Geylang International	Jurong East
	Nicky Melvin Singh 32'; Sim Jun Yen 38'; Aneeq Fairus (yellow card) 62'; Soshi Kadowaki (yellow card) 79'; Jaden Heng (yellow card) 81'		Timothy Cheng 58'; Gareth Low (yellow card) 74'; Faisal Shahril (yellow card) 79'	Stadium: Jurong East Stadium; Referee: Mazlan Pagira

17 March 2026	Hougang United (Singapore)	2–3	(Singapore) Young Lions	Jalan Besar
	Woo Chun Wei 83'; Ryaan Sanizal 89'; Aizil Yazid (yellow card) 19'		Garv Sahoo 11', 47'; Abner Vinicius 38' (pen.)	Stadium: Jalan Besar Stadium; Referee: Taufik Thana

17 March 2026	BG Tampines Rovers (Singapore)	2–0	(Singapore) Tanjong Pagar United	Tampines
	Zikos Chua 60'; Jasper Chen 85'; Sky Yeo (yellow card) 28'		Anaqi Ismit (yellow card) 72'; Aloysius Pang (yellow card) 78'; Kenji Syed Rusydi (yellow card) 88'	Stadium: Our Tampines Hub; Referee: Hilmi Fuad

17 March 2026	Lion City Sailors (Singapore)	1–4	(Singapore) Balestier Khalsa	Bishan
	Adam Faisal 13'; Akmal Azman (yellow card) 45'		Irfan Iskandar 8', 27' (yellow card) 38'; Yanir Ben Eliezer 32'; Aqil Dany 75'; Syabil Hisham (yellow card) 14'; Ifat Sha'aban (yellow card) 62'	Stadium: Bishan Stadium; Referee: Khairul Amri

==== Round 18 ====
30 March 2026	Young Lions (Singapore)	2–2	(Singapore) Tanjong Pagar United	Jurong East
	Uchenna Eziakor 29'; Kai Sheng Loo 54'; Ajay Robson (yellow card) 60'		Junior Djile 75'; Anaqi Ismit 86'; Fathullah Rahmat (yellow card) 15'; Aiqel Aliman (yellow card) 78'; Faizal Roslan (yellow card) 82'	Stadium: Jurong East Stadium; Referee: Yazid Abdul Latiff

30 March 2026	Hougang United (Singapore)	2–1	(Singapore) Lion City Sailors	Jalan Besar
	Wong Ngang Haang 77'; Chonlawit Kanuengkid 81'; Ganesan Silloren (yellow card) 19'; Matin Manaf (yellow card) 20'; Brant Tan (yellow card) 45'; Syady Sufwan (yellow card) 83'; Chun Wei Woo (yellow card) 90+1'		Ahmad Danial 10'; Ikmal Hazlan (yellow card) 19'; Raiyan Izdihar (yellow card) 57'	Stadium: Jalan Besar Stadium; Referee: Oswind Suriya

31 March 2026	Geylang International (Singapore)	0–7	(Singapore) BG Tampines Rovers	Choa Chu Kang
	Ryu Hardy (yellow card) 9'; Irfan Riqifi (yellow card) 83'; Yusri Hanapi (yellow card) 90+3'		Hide Higashikawa 1', 41'; Yuki Kobayashi 39'; Anton Yen Goh 40'; Taufik Suparno 85'; Tallo Ngao 86'; Marc Ryan Tan 90+5'	Stadium: Choa Chu Kang Stadium; Referee: Thawfeek Ahamad

31 March 2026	Balestier Khalsa (Singapore)	0–1	(Japan) Albirex Niigata (S)	Bishan
	Syafi Hilman (yellow card) 60'		Soshi Kadowaki 75'; Aqil Zafri (yellow card) 35'; Jaden Heng (yellow card) 45'; Nicky Melvin Singh (yellow card) 52'; Syed Firdaus Hassan (yellow card) 53'	Stadium: Bishan Stadium; Referee: Faris Abdul Rahman

==== Round 19 ====
7 April 2026	Tanjong Pagar United (Singapore)	1–1	(Singapore) Geylang International	Jalan Besar
	Anaqi Ismit 56'; Samuel Pillai (yellow card) 50'; Aiqel Aliman (yellow card) 73'; Danny Ali (yellow card) 90'		Abdusukur Abduryim 85'; Kyan Neo (yellow card) 25'; Faisal Shahril (yellow card) 48'; Ryu Hardy (yellow card) 89'	Stadium: Jalan Besar Stadium; Referee: Muhammad Noor Adzdzeeq

7 April 2026	BG Tampines Rovers (Singapore)	5–2	(Singapore) Balestier Khalsa	Tampines
	Ong Yu En 23' (yellow card) 45'; Anton Yen 30'; Zikos Chua 33', 65'; Zeeshan Iskandar 75'; Lim Zheng Wu (yellow card) 35'		Kegan Phang 15' (o.g.); Ilyasin Zayan 41'; Aqil Dany (yellow card) 20'; Syabil Hisham (yellow card) 35'; Irfan Mika'il (yellow card) 43'	Stadium: Our Tampines Hub; Referee: Mazlan Pagira

7 April 2026	Lion City Sailors (Singapore)	2–5	(Singapore) Young Lions	Bishan
	Sérgio Mendonça 11', 63', 70'; Adam Irfan 86', 90+5'; Adam Faisal (yellow card) 14'		Ahmad Danial 20'; Yasir Nizamudin 89'; Iryan Fandi (yellow card) 58'; Harith Danish Irwan (yellow card) 78'	Stadium: Bishan Stadium; Referee: Aldrick Lee

7 April 2026	Albirex Niigata (S) (Japan)	4–1	(Singapore) Hougang United	Jurong East
	Naoki Yoshioka 44'; Helmi Shahrol 72'; Syukri Bashir 75', 87'; Aqil Zafri (yellow card) 77'		Farhan Sahlan 77'; Syady Sufwan (yellow card) 74'; G. Jeeva (yellow card) 87'	Stadium: Jurong East Stadium; Referee: Khairul Amri

==== Round 20 ====
14 April 2026	Balestier Khalsa (Singapore)	1–1	(Singapore) Tanjong Pagar United	Bishan
	Hugh Alexander Lobsey 11' (yellow card) 45'; Dany Irfan (yellow card) 81'		Sahil Suhaimi 13'; Jesse Daley (yellow card) 41'; Samuel Pillai (yellow card) 90+1'	Stadium: Bishan Stadium; Referee: Thawfeek Ahamad

14 April 2026	Hougang United (Singapore)	0–1	(Singapore) BG Tampines Rovers	Tampines
	Khilfi Aniq (yellow card) 27'; Kanok Kongsimma (yellow card) 52' (red card) 77'; Matin Manaf (yellow card) 60'		Tallo Ngao 80' (pen.) (yellow card) 85'; Ong Yu En (yellow card) 65'; Iman Hakim (yellow card) 90+5'	Stadium: Our Tampines Hub; Referee: Faris Abdul Rahman

14 April 2026	Young Lions (Singapore)	3–1	(Singapore) Geylang International	Jalan Besar
	Amir Syafiz 27'; Sérgio Mendonça 57'; Harry Spence 67' (yellow card) 62'		Pathyn Banesh 89'; Irfan Riqifi (yellow card) 72' (yellow-red card) 78'	Stadium: Jalan Besar Stadium; Referee: Taufik Thana

14 April 2026	Lion City Sailors (Singapore)	2–0	(Japan) Albirex Niigata (S)	Jurong East
	Aiman Zayani 16' (yellow card) 90+5'; Ahmad Danial 47' (pen.); Aaryan Fikri (yellow card) 60'; Adam Faisal (yellow card) 68'; Ikmal Hazlan (yellow card) 90'		Ren Nishimura (yellow card) 21'; Aqil Zafri (yellow card) 51'; Daniel Martens (yellow card) 83'	Stadium: Jurong East Stadium; Referee: Yazid Abdul Latiff

==== Round 21 ====
21 April 2026	Tanjong Pagar United (Singapore)	2–1	(Singapore) Hougang United	Jurong East
	Azim Akbar 30'; Sahil Suhaimi 90' (yellow card) 42'; Naufal Ilham (yellow card) 21'; Aloysius Pang (yellow card) 88'		Ganesan Silloren 45'; Algirdas Karlonas (yellow card) 62'	Stadium: Jurong East Stadium; Referee: Syarqawi Buhari

21 April 2026	BG Tampines Rovers (Singapore)	1–2	(Singapore) Lion City Sailors	Tampines
	Tallo Ngao 30' (pen.); Qylfie Ryan (yellow card) 85'		Ahmad Danial 65', 89'	Stadium: Our Tampines Hub; Referee: Aldrick Lee

21 April 2026	Geylang International (Singapore)	6–1	(Singapore) Balestier Khalsa	Bishan
	Abdusukur Abduryim 26', 70'; Timothy Cheng 31'; Ryu Hardy 35' (yellow card) 64'; Vedant Raj 43', 45'; Aniq Matin (yellow card) 49'; Nizwan Izzairie (red card) 90+3'		Ifat Sha'aban 75'; Karthigaya Varmaan (yellow card) 90'; Yanir Ben Eliezer (red card) 90+3'	Stadium: Bishan Stadium; Referee: Muhammad Zulfiqar

21 April 2026	Albirex Niigata (S) (Japan)	2–1	(Singapore) Young Lions	Jalan Besar
	Ren Nishimura 1' (yellow card) 50'; Helmi Shahrol 75'; Aqil Zafri (yellow card) 83'; Shakthi Vinayagavijayan (yellow card) 86'; Danish Qayyum (yellow card) 89'		Abner Vinicius 44' (pen.); Fairuz Fazli (yellow card) 17'; Muhammad Fadly (yellow card) 32'	Stadium: Jalan Besar Stadium; Referee: Mazlan Pagira

== Statistics ==
=== Top scorers ===
As of 7 May 2026

Rank	Player	Team	Goals
1	(Japan) (Ghana) Tallo Ngao	(Singapore) BG Tampines Rovers II	13
2	(Singapore) Ahmad Danial	(Singapore) Lion City Sailors II	11
3	(Singapore) Helmi Shahrol	(Japan) Albirex Niigata (S) II	9
3	(Singapore) Ifat Sha'aban	(Singapore) Balestier Khalsa II	9
3	(Singapore) (England) Timothy Cheng	(Singapore) Geylang International II	9
4	(Singapore) Sahil Suhaimi	(Singapore) Tanjong Pagar United II	8
5	(Singapore) (Greece) Zikos Vasileios Chua	(Singapore) BG Tampines Rovers II	7
5	(Brazil) Sérgio Mendonça	(Singapore) Young Lions B	7
6	(Singapore) (France) Nicolas Benninger	(Singapore) Young Lions B	6
6	(Singapore) Garv Sahoo	(Singapore) Young Lions B	6
7	(Singapore) Amy Recha	(Japan) Albirex Niigata (S) II (Singapore) Geylang International II (Note: Amy Recha scored 4 for Albirex, 1 for Geylang.)	5
7	(Japan) Soshi Kadowaki	(Japan) Albirex Niigata (S) II	5
7	(Spain) (Morocco) Youssef Ezzejjari	(Singapore) Tanjong Pagar United II	5
8	(Singapore) Jaden Heng	(Japan) Albirex Niigata (S) II	4
8	(Singapore) Syukri Bashir	(Japan) Albirex Niigata (S) II	4
8	(Norway) Abdusukur Abduryim	(Singapore) Geylang International II	4
8	(Singapore) Prince Rio Rifae'i	(Singapore) Geylang International II	4
8	(Singapore) Ikmal Hazlan	(Singapore) Lion City Sailors II	4
8	(Singapore) (Nepal) Namsang Rai	(Singapore) Lion City Sailors II	4
8	(Singapore) Ilyasin Zayan	(Singapore) Young Lions B (Singapore) Balestier Khalsa II (Note: Ilyasin Zayan scored 3 for Young Lions, 1 for Balestier.)	4
