= LiVE Exchange =

Thai stock exchange

- LiVEx
- Type: Stock exchange
- Location: Bangkok, Thailand
- Founded: 2022; 4 years ago
- Currency: Thai baht
- No. of listings: 10 (total listed companies)
- Market cap: ฿5.47 billion

The LiVE Exchange (LiVEx) is a Thai stock exchange established in 2022 by the Stock Exchange of Thailand (SET) and the Securities and Exchange Commission of Thailand (SEC) to facilitate the growth of SMEs and startups via public offerings. LiVEx works jointly with the LiVE Platform, an educational platform to provide business readiness for new entrepreneurs.

LiVEx is the third and most recently established equity market that comprises the SET, the other two being the Main Market (SET) and the Market for Alternative Investment (mai). LiVEx has lower listing requirements than mai to promote the development of new companies and encourage domestic investment. As of 5 May 2026 there are 10 LiVEx-listed companies, with a total market capitalization of ฿5.47 billion and a total fundraising value of ฿395 million.

== Listing Requirements ==
LiVEx has much more lenient regulations and admission requirements than both the SET and mai. There are no requirements for minimum paid-in capital, shareholders' equity, an operation track record, or engagement with a financial adviser. LiVEx companies are also exempt from SEC fees.

The requirements for LiVEx admission are as follows:

- Must be a public limited company permitted by the SEC to offer public shares
- Must be a either a small-sized company, as defined by the Office of Small and Medium Enterprise Promotion (OSMEP), or a startup funded by venture capital or a private equity fund
- A public offering valued between ฿10 million and ฿500 million
- Annual income between ฿100 million and ฿500 million for SMEs, or between ฿50 million and ฿300 million for service businesses
- Engagement with an underwriter
- Various auditing and disclosure requirements, as well as initial and annual fees

Companies are also required to submit biannual financial disclosures to stay listed, compared to the quarterly disclosures required in the SET and mai.

== Investor Requirements ==
Unlike the normal public offerings listed on the SET and mai, the SEC limits the types of investors allowed to invest in companies on LiVEx. To invest, you must be one of the following:

- an institutional investor, such as a commercial bank or securities company
- a venture capitalist or private equity firm
- someone with experience and expertise in investment
- someone with a prescribed relationship with the company, such as an executive or a major shareholder
- a high or ultra-high net worth investor with at least ฿8 million in direct investment if a natural person, or ฿15 if a juristic entity

== History ==
Real Smart pcl, a turnkey AI technology and data developer, began trading on LiVEx under the ticker symbol "REAL25" on 25 September 2025.

On 7 November 2025, the first company to "graduate" from LiVEx, MMM Capital Public Company Limited, began trading on mai under the ticker symbol "MMM." MMM is seen as proof of LiVEx's effectiveness in promoting business growth.

Energy Thai Trading Hub pcl, a solar power producer, began trading under the ticker symbol "ETTH26" on 30 January 2026.

== See also ==
- Stock Exchange of Thailand
- Market for Alternative Investment
- Securities and Exchange Commission of Thailand
