= Singapore Premier League 2 =

Professional association football league

- Organising body: Football Association of Singapore (FAS)
- Founded: 2 July 2025; 15 months ago 23 August 2025; 13 months ago
- Country: Singapore (8 teams)
- Confederation: AFC
- Number of clubs: 8
- Level on pyramid: 2 (reserve league)
- Website: fas.org.sg
- Current: 2026–27 Singapore Premier League 2

The Singapore Premier League 2, commonly abbreviated as the SPL2, officially known as the AIA Singapore Premier League for sponsorship reasons, is a men's football reserve league sanctioned by the Football Association of Singapore (FAS), which represents the sport's second highest level in the Singapore football league system.

The league was founded as the Singapore Premier League 2 on 2 July 2025, after the FAS announced its intention to promote and expand the growing local football community by having a developmental league under the Singapore Premier League, the country's top flight league.

A precursor to SPL2 was the Prime League, for the reserve and youth players of S. League clubs, which was organised by the FAS from 1997 to 2017.

== History ==
The league aims to ensure Singaporean players get sufficient playing time, and was introduced to replace the SPL under-21 competition. The league established a clear link between development and first-team football, with squads integrated across both competitions. This structure aligns both club needs and national development, by expanding the base of competitive opportunities while keeping quality and progression at the forefront.

Clubs must register a combined squad for both the SPL and SPL2, with a minimum of 36 and a maximum of 50 players. At least 25 of them must be Singaporeans. First-team players and foreigners are allowed to play in the league, of which a minimum of six locals, four of whom must be under-23, on the pitch at all time. In addition, senior players can participate where it is appropriate to regain fitness or form.

== Clubs ==
A total of 8 clubs have played in the league from its inception in the 2025–26 season.

Club	Founded	Based	Stadium	Capacity
Albirex Niigata (S) II	2004	Jurong East	Jurong East Stadium	2,700
Balestier Khalsa II	1898	Bishan	Bishan Stadium	3,800
Geylang International II	1973	Bedok	Bedok Stadium	3,800
Lion City Sailors II	1946	Bishan	Bishan Stadium	6,254
Hougang United II	1998	Hougang	Hougang Stadium	6,000
Tampines Rovers II	1945	Tampines	Our Tampines Hub	5,000
Tanjong Pagar United II	1974	Queenstown	Queenstown Stadium	3,800
Young Lions B	2002	Kallang	Jalan Besar Stadium	6,000

== See also ==
- Singapore Premier League
- Singapore Cup
- Singapore League Cup
- Singapore Community Shield
- Singapore National Football League
- Sports in Singapore
- Football in Singapore
- List of football clubs in Singapore
- Women's Premier League (Singapore)
- Singapore Premier League Award winners
- Prime League
- Singapore Selection XI
