= Farm Chokchai =

Dairy farm in Thailand

Coordinates: 14°39′10.61″N 101°21′1.07″E

Farm Chokchai is dairy farm in Thailand, and the largest in Asia. It was founded in 1957 by Chokchai Bulakul and is situated on over 8,000 acres of land in Pak Chong, Nakhon Ratchasima province.

Apart from having the largest dairy production, Farm Chokchai also operates a chain of steakhouse restaurants across Southeast Asia under the Chokchai Steakhouse brand, and a chain of ice cream locations across Asia under the Umm!..Milk brand.

Farm Chokchai serves as a popular tourist attraction, ranked as the #1 attraction in Pak Chong by Tripadvisor.

The area surrounding Farm Chokchai has seen significant appreciation over the past 60 years and the value of the land under Farm Chokchai is estimated now above THB 35bn (USD $1 billion).

== See also ==
- Bulakul family
