= UBIS (Asia) =

- Company type: Public
- Traded as: MAI: UBIS
- Industry: Chemicals
- Founded: 17 June 1997; 28 years ago
- Headquarters: Yannawa, Bangkok, Thailand
- Number of locations: 1 office, 1 factory
- Area served: Southeast Asia
- Products: can sealing compounds, lacquers and coatings
- Revenue: ▲BT฿574.36 million (2009)
- Operating income: ▲BT฿101.10 million (2009)
- Net income: ▲BT฿70.07 million (2009)
- Total assets: ▲BT฿406.12 million (2009)
- Total equity: ▲BT฿305.24 million (2009)
- Number of employees: 80 (2009)
- Subsidiaries: Vita International Trading (Guangzhou) Co., Ltd.
- Website: www.ubisasia.com

UBIS (Asia) Public Company Limited (UBIS) is a manufacturer and distributor of sealing compounds, lacquers and coatings used in can production and bottle closure for the food, beverage and general industries based in Thailand. It is listed on the Market for Alternative Investment on 9 May 2007.

== History ==
UBIS (Asia) was established on 17 June 1997 with initial registered capital of 4 million baht. In June 2006, UBIS increased its registered capital to 190 million baht (190 million shares).

In June 2005, Henkel signed license agreement with the company to sale and produce Can End Sealants with UBIS's technology for Europe, Middle East, Africa and America.
