= Bulakul family =

Thai Chinese business family

Bulakul บูลกุล Saema
- Parent family: Ma family
- Current region: Bangkok
- Origin: Guangdong, China
- Founded: 1888
- Founder: Ma Tong-zen (1888, immigrant); Mah Bulakul (1941, adopted surname)
- Current head: Chan Bulakul

The Bulakul family (Thai: บูลกุล) is one of Thailand's first and oldest business and political families and is of Cantonese Chinese descent, descended from the Ma clan. It traces its origins to Ma Tong-zen (Chinese: 馬棠政, 1871–1923), an engineer who immigrated to Siam in 1888, and his son Ma Liap-khun (馬立群, 1897–1964), who adopted the Thai name Mah Bulakul (มา บูลกุล) in 1941, the surname being granted by Prime Minister Plaek Phibunsongkhram, under royal decree. Mah built his fortune from rice milling starting in the early 20th century and was part of the "Big Five" families across Asia to control rice trade, while also holding prominent political positions. In 1956, Mah's daughter Niramol Bulakul was the first Thai woman to graduate from the Massachusetts Institute of Technology with a Master of Science (MS).

Beginning in the 1980s, the Bulakul family was one of the families who partnered with Japanese trading houses in Thailand and chaired the Thai-Japanese Association. The family's business holdings has since expanded under his descendants to form a conglomerate covering real estate, financial services, retail, shipping, food, and media.

Among the family's holdings and past ventures are the Mah Boon Krong Drying and Silo Company, which expanded into retail under Mah's son Sirichai Bulakul and developed Mahboonkrong Center, the largest shopping mall in Southeast Asia when it opened in 1985, and now part of the MBK Group; MBK Group has several businesses within its portfolio, including shopping centres, hotels, golf courses, real estate, food services and financial services; Farm Chokchai, an 8,000 acre ranch and one of the largest dairy farms in Asia and on a significant value property of land in Khao Yai; The Brooker Group, a listed financial services focused on alternative assets. The majority of the family's businesses remain in real estate and are privately held.
