= The Brooker Group =

Thai company

- Industry: Business and financial consulting services, investments and lending money
- Founded: 1994
- Founder: Chan Bulakul
- Headquarters: Thailand

Brooker Group Public Company Limited is a Thailand-based listed company. The Company is primarily engaged in business and financial consulting services, investments and lending money. Its segments include Business Consulting, Investments and Digital Assets.

The Brooker Group is the #1 largest holder of digital assets among public companies in Southeast Asia, the #2 largest holder in Asia, and the #15 largest holder across the globe.

== History ==
The Brooker Group was founded in 1994 by Chan Bulakul of the Bulakul family in Thailand. In the late 1990s, it focused on restructuring and distressed assets advisory and investments across Southeast Asia as a result of the 1997 Asian Financial Crisis, advising family owned businesses across Southeast Asia on how to navigate through the crisis. As a result, the majority of its clients today are HNWIs (High Net-Worth Individuals) who invest in alternative assets globally.

The Company later became the first Southeast Asian entity to be listed on the MAI (Market for Alternative Investments) exchange in 2001 and developed a reputation as an expert in alternative assets.

In 2016, The Brooker Group was named on Forbes' "Asia's Best Under a Billion" list.

The Brooker Group's founder started the Young Presidents' Organization (YPO) Chapter for Thailand.

== Digital Assets ==
In 2020, The Brooker Group established its digital assets division and became the first publicly listed company in Southeast Asia approved by regulating authorities to invest in non-listed digital assets.

In 2022, The Brooker Group invested US$10 million into Binance Labs Investment Fund, the investment arm of cryptocurrency exchange Binance, becoming one of three members of the limited partner's advisory boards for family offices.

The Brooker Group is the #1 largest holder of digital assets among public companies in Southeast Asia, the #2 largest holder in Asia, and the #15 largest holder across the globe.
