= Market for Alternative Investment =

Thai stock exchange

mai
- Market for Alternative Investment
- Type: Stock exchange
- Location: Bangkok, Thailand
- Founded: 21 June 1999; 27 years ago
- Currency: Thai baht
- No. of listings: 225 (12 June 2025)
- Market cap: ฿218.05 billion
- Indices: mai index
- Website: https://www.set.or.th/en/market/index/mai/overview

The Market for Alternative Investment (MAI or mai) is a Thai stock exchange established by the Stock Exchange of Thailand (SET) in 1998 under the Securities Exchange of Thailand Act as an alternative stock market for small and medium-sized enterprises (SMEs). It officially commenced operation on 21 June 1999. It is located in Khlong Toei, Bangkok, and as of 12 June 2025 lists 225 companies.

The SET allows mai to operate independently under the supervision of the SET's board of directors. The mai committee sets its policies and oversees the market's operation and front office duties such as stock listing and public relations. Back office functions, such as the trading system, clearing and settlement procedures, trading surveillance and supervision, as well as disclosure requirements, are based entirely on existing Stock Exchange of Thailand operations.

The SET is composed of three other markets, those being the Main Market (SET), the LiVE Exchange (LiVEx) for certain SMEs and startups with lower listing requirements, and the Thailand Future Exchange (TFEX) for derivatives. Like all capital markets in Thailand, mai is regulated by the Securities and Exchange Commission of Thailand (SEC), which has fees and disclosure requirements for all companies listed in mai.

== Listing Requirements ==
For a company to be listed on mai, it must meet the following requirements:

- Two years of operation track record
- A minimum of ฿50 million in paid-in capital after the IPO
- A minimum shareholders' equity of ฿100 million
- At least 300 shareholders
- A minimum public offering to minority shareholders of:
  - 30% if paid-in capital is less than ฿300 million
  - 25% if paid-in capital is between ฿300 million and ฿3 billion
  - 20% if paid-in capital is more than ฿3 billion
- A net income of at least ฿42 million in the last 2 or 3 years, and a minimum net income of ฿25 million in the most recent year; or, if operating in certain prioritized industries, a market capitalization test will suffice
- Financially healthy and stable and having sufficient working capital
- Various payment and disclosure agreements with the SET and the SEC

Companies also must fulfill various post-listing requirements to stay on mai.

== mai Index ==
The mai Index is a composite stock index that reflects the stock price movement of all common stocks trading on mai. It is a capitalization-weighted index calculated from the price of all common stocks on the mai, excluding stocks that have been suspended for three or more months. The mai Index has a base value of 100 points that was set on 2 September 2002. As of 28 July 2026, the index's value was 226.03 points (+4.14% YTD), down from a five-year high of 689.31 points on 15 September 2022.

== Milestones ==
11 November 1998:

The Office of the Securities and Exchange Commission approves in principle the establishment of the market for listing securities of small and medium enterprises by the Stock Exchange of Thailand (SET).

21 June 1999:

The mai officially commenced operation. The Minister of Finance emphasized the important role of the mai in supporting and strengthening Small and Medium-sized Enterprises.

16 January 2000:

Mr. Yuth Vorachattarn is appointed to be the first Managing Director of the mai. His goal is to develop the mai to be an efficient secondary market for Small and Medium-sized Enterprises, and to be a modern and dynamic market to promote international best practices for Thai businesses.

10 April 2000:

The mai announces a new listing category, “Section 2: Hi-Growth Enterprises”, to broaden the fund-raising opportunities for firms that had high growth potential even though they were relatively small, such as those in the technology industry.

17 September 2001:

The mai starts official trading. BROOK is the first company to be actually listed on the mai

3 September 2002:

The mai created its Index to provide investors with a valuable tool for understanding stock price movements on the mai. The index's base was the trading value of listed securities on the previous day, 2 September 2002

1 November 2004 Mr. Vichate Tantiwanich was appointed as the mai's President effective from 1 November 2004 onwards.

25 May 2005:

SET Board approves official Thai name for the Market for Alternative Investment (mai) which will be M-A-I, (pronounced as the 3 individual English letters) instead of "mai" (as in "pi").

15 February 2006:

The Board of Governors of The Stock Exchange of Thailand (SET) appoints Mr. Chanitr Charnchainarong to be the President of the Market for Alternative Investment (mai). (SET Press Release No. 21/2006 dated 9 February 2006)

29 January 2007:

Multibax Public Company Limited is the 50th company to be listed on the mai (mai Press Release No. 3/2007 dated 29 January 2007)

== Listed companies ==
MAI listed companies as of 4 May 2010:

MAI Symbol	Company	Market Capitalization	Official site
ACAP	ACAP Advisory Public Company Limited	750,000,000	
ADAM	Adamas Incorporation Public Company Limited	337,146,024	
AGE	Asia Green Energy Public Company Limited	952,000,000	
AIM	Absolute Impact Public Company Limited	252,000,000	
BGT	BGT Corporation Public Company Limited	220,800,000	
BOL	Business Online Public Company Limited		
BROOK	The Brooker Group Public Company Limited		
BSM	Buildersmart Public Company Limited		
CHUO	Chuo Senko (Thailand) Public Company Limited		
CIG	C.I. Group Public Company Limited		
CMO	CM Organizer Public Company Limited		
CPR	CPR Gomu Industrial Public Company Limited		
CRANE	Chu Kai Public Company Limited		
D1	Dragon One Public Company Limited		
DEMCO	DEMCO Public Company Limited		
DIMET	Dimet (Siam) Public Company Limited		
DM	Dhanamitr Factoring Public Company Limited		
E	Evolution Capital Public Company Limited		
ETG	Eternity Grand Logistics Public Company Limited		
FOCUS	Focus Development and Construction Public Company Limited		
GFM	Goldfine Manufacturers Public Company Limited		
ILINK	Interlink Communication Public Company Limited		
IRCP	International Research Corporation Public Company Limited		
KASET	Thai Ha Public Company Limited		
KIAT	Kiattana Transport Public Company Limited	3,100,000,000	
L&E	Lighting and Equipment Public Company Limited		
LVT	L.V. Technology Public Company Limited		
MACO	Master Ad Public Company Limited		
MBAX	Multibax Public Company Limited		
PICO	Pico Thailand Public Company Limited		
PPM	Porn Prom Metal Public Company Limited		
PR124	124 Communications Public Company Limited		
PYLON	Pylon Public Company Limited		
SALEE	Salee Industry Public Company Limited		
SIMAT	SIMAT Technologies Public Company Limited		
SLC	Solution Corner (1998) Public Company Limited		
STAR	Star Sanitaryware Public Company Limited		
STEEL	Steel Intertech Public Company Limited		
SWC	Sherwood Chemicals Public Company Limited		
TAPAC	Tapaco Public Company Limited		
TIES	Thai Industrial and Engineering Service Public Company Limited		
TMW	Thai Mitsuwa Public Company Limited		
TNDT	Thai Nondestructive Testing Public Company Limited		
TNH	Thai Nakarin Hospital Public Company Limited	1,278,000,000	
TPAC	Thai Plaspac Public Company Limited	905,000,000	
TRC	TRC Construction Public Company Limited	590,700,000	
TRT	Tirathai Public Company Limited	1,537,912,703	
UBIS	UBIS (Asia) Public Company Limited	805,600,000	
UEC	Unimit Engineering Public Company Limited	1,555,840,000	
UKEM	Union Petrochemical Public Company Limited	514,800,000	
UMS	Unique Mining Services Public Company Limited		
YUASA	Yuasa Battery (Thailand) Public Company Limited		

== See also ==
- Economy of Thailand
- Stock Exchange of Thailand
- SET50 Index and SET100 Index
