= Warrix Sports =

Thai sport manufacturing company

Warrix Sport Public Company Limited
- Type: Public
- Industry: Apparel; Sportswear; Sports Equipment
- Founded: 2013; 13 years ago
- Founder: Wisan Wanasaksrisakul
- Headquarters: 849/6-8 Stadium One, Rama VI Road, Bangkok
- Products: Sneakers; Sports equipment
- Website: warrix.co.th

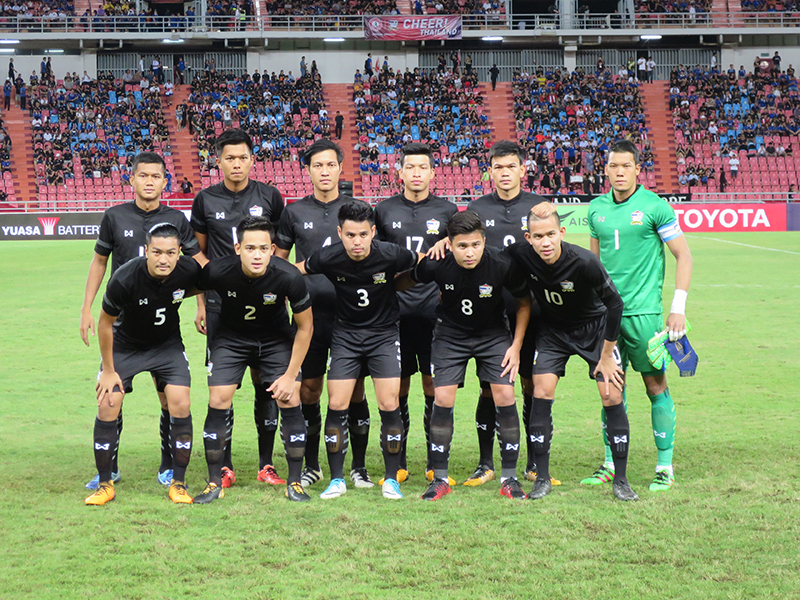
The Thailand national football team 2017 Chayanuparb kit by Warrix

Warrix Sport Public Company Limited
- Native name: บริษัท วอริกซ์ สปอร์ต จำกัด (มหาชน)
- Type: Public
- Traded as: SET: WARRIX
- Industry: Apparel, sportswear, sports equipment
- Founded: 2013; 13 years ago
- Founder: Wisan Wanasaksrisakul
- Headquarters: 849/6–8 Stadium One, Rama VI Road, Wang Mai, Pathum Wan, Bangkok 10330, Thailand
- Products: Sport shoes, sports equipment, sports apparel
- Brands: Warrix, Comba Cool, Comba Lite, Combatec
- Website: warrix.co.th

Warrix Sport Public Company Limited (บริษัท วอริกซ์ สปอร์ต จำกัด (มหาชน); SET: WARRIX), trading as Warrix, is a Thai sportswear and lifestyle apparel company founded in 2013 by Wisan Wanasaksrisakul. Headquartered at Stadium One on Rama VI Road in Bangkok, the company is best known as the official kit manufacturer of the Thailand national football team since 2017.

Beyond sportswear, Warrix has expanded into lifestyle apparel — including polo shirts, T-shirts and jeans — built around its proprietary cooling-fabric technologies branded "Comba Cool" and "Comba Lite". The company was listed on the Market for Alternative Investment (mai) of the Stock Exchange of Thailand on 21 December 2022.

== History ==
Warrix was founded in 2013 by Thai entrepreneur Wisan Wanasaksrisakul. The brand name was inspired by Thai warriors of the Ayutthaya era. The company began by sponsoring Thai League clubs Chiangmai F.C. and Nakhon Ratchasima F.C. in 2014.

In 2016 Warrix won the bid to become the official kit manufacturer of the Thailand national football team in a contract valued at 400 million baht, replacing Grand Sport. The first two kits — named Chayanuparb and Prabtrichak after legendary Thai warriors — debuted in a 2018 FIFA World Cup qualifying match between Thailand and Saudi Arabia on 9 February 2017.

=== Public listing ===
On 21 December 2022, Warrix Sport was listed on the Market for Alternative Investment (mai) under the ticker symbol "WARRIX", with an IPO price of 6.30 baht per share (par value 0.50 baht), giving it an initial market capitalisation of approximately 3.78 billion baht.

In 2025 the company joined the Stock Exchange of Thailand's JUMP+ Corporate Value Creation programme.

== Business segments ==
Warrix operates across three principal segments:

- Sportswear — football kits, training apparel and team equipment for national teams, professional clubs and federations.
- Lifestyle apparel — polo shirts, T-shirts and jeans for everyday casual wear, marketed under the main Warrix label.
- Licensed and made-to-order products — replica national-team merchandise, club kits and corporate uniforms.

According to the company's IPO filings, in the first nine months of 2022 non-licensed products contributed roughly 79% of revenue (classic 34.9%, collection 28.3%, made-to-order 16.2%), while licensed national-team and club products contributed the remainder.

== Fabric technologies ==
Warrix invests in in-house fabric and yarn R&D as a core differentiator in the Thai sportswear and lifestyle market. The company operates three proprietary technology platforms, segmented by use case and price tier: Combatec (professional sport performance), Comba Cool (premium lifestyle) and Comba Lite (entry-level lifestyle).

=== Comba tech ===
Comba tech is Warrix's flagship sport-performance fibre and weaving technology, used in the Thailand national football team kits. The company claims Combatec yarn dissipates heat from the body roughly three times faster than conventional polyester. Seven advertised features:

- Specially developed fibre
- Lightweight, cool-touch fabric
- Quick dry
- Heat dissipation 3× faster than conventional polyester
- Sweat absorption
- Body temperature reduction
- Breathability

=== Comba Cool (premium lifestyle) ===
Comba Cool is a lifestyle-oriented version of Combatec designed for everyday wear. The fabric blends cotton and polyester in a mesh weave, combining the softness of cotton with the technical properties of synthetic fibre.

The technology is advertised as having:

- instant cooling sensation on contact,
- excellent airflow with no clamminess,
- fast drying,
- smooth fabric that does not cling to skin, and
- rapid sweat absorption.

=== Comba Lite (entry-level lifestyle) ===
Comba Lite is a technology focused on lightness and breathability, designed for everyday activities and cheer-fan apparel. The fabric is lighter than Comba Cool.

The technology is advertised as being:

- soft, smooth and non-irritating;
- wrinkle-resistant;
- quick-dry (with rapid moisture evaporation);
- odour-resistant;
- lightweight;
- flexible; and
- breathable.

=== Technology comparison ===
Technology	Target user	Composition	Key claim	Price range (THB)
Combatec	Pro athletes, national teams	Proprietary fibre	3× faster heat dissipation vs polyester	Kit pricing
Comba Cool	Premium lifestyle	60% cotton / 40% polyester	Cool / Breathable / Quick Dry / Smooth / Absorb	390–790
Comba Lite	Lifestyle	Lightweight blend	Lightweight, breathable, accessible price	250–290

== Lifestyle product lines ==
Since the late 2010s Warrix has positioned itself as a "Sport, Health and Lifestyle" company, expanding from a sport-kit manufacturer into an everyday-wear brand. The lifestyle range applies the Combatec, Comba Cool and Comba Lite cooling technologies originally developed for sport, emphasising cool comfort suited to Thailand's hot and humid climate.

=== Polo shirts ===
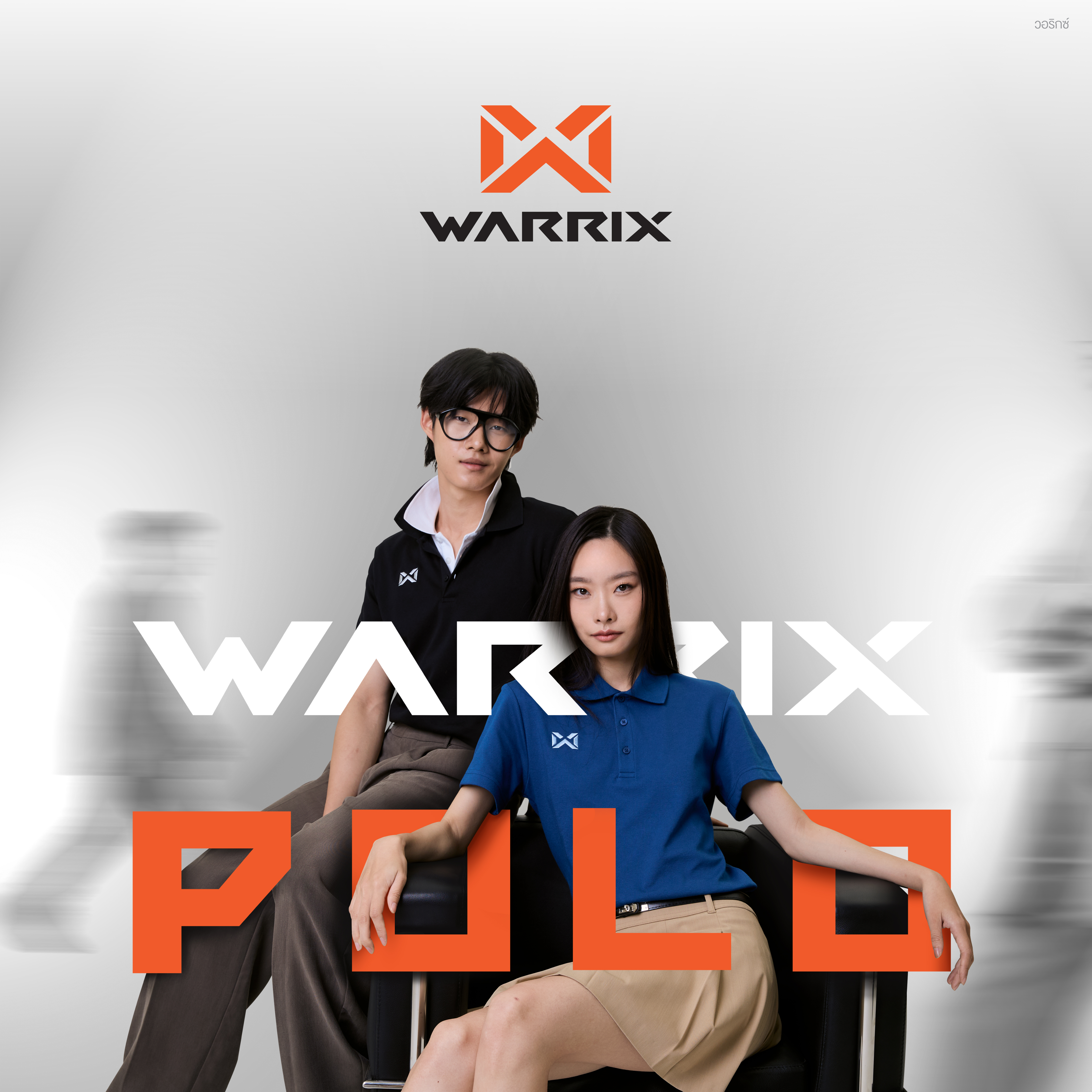
Warrix polo fashion set 2026

Polo shirts are Warrix's largest lifestyle category and the primary vehicle for communicating its cooling-fabric technologies. The line is divided into three sub-collections:

- Polo Comba Cool — premium tier; 60% cotton / 40% polyester mesh with Quick-dry / Cool Wear / Breathable properties; available in slim and regular fit; approximately 790 baht
- Polo Warrix — entry tier; lightweight fabric for sport and casual use; approximately 299–599 baht
- Cheer Polo (national team) — licensed Thailand national football polo on Comba Lite fabric, designed for fans on matchday and in everyday life

The polo range spans office wear, casual wear, corporate uniforms and football fan merchandise, giving it the broadest customer base in the lifestyle range.

=== T-shirts ===
Warrix's T-shirt range uses both Comba Cool and Comba Lite as key selling points, with several sub-lines:

- Comba Cool Mesh Normal Fit — regular-fit mesh T-shirt; approximately 390 baht
- Comba Cool Mesh Oversize — streetwear-styled oversize cut targeting Gen Z, in colours such as Military Green and Grey; approximately 490–550 baht
- Comba Lite Mesh Normal Fit — regular-fit T-shirt with light, comfortable fabric in pastel colours suited to all ages; approximately 250–290 baht
- Graphic T-shirts — both in-house designs and licensed collaborations
- National team replica/cheer T-shirts — licensed merchandise for football fans

=== Jeans ===
Warrix introduced its denim line as part of its lifestyle expansion, positioning it as a "head-to-toe" offering alongside polo shirts and T-shirts so that customers can assemble a complete outfit from a single brand. Entry pricing starts around 990 baht.

=== Collections and collaborations ===
In addition to its core categories, Warrix periodically releases special collections and licensed collaborations to reach new customer segments. According to the company's IPO filings, the "Collection" group accounted for approximately 28% of non-licensed product revenue in the first nine months of 2022.

=== Distribution channels ===
Warrix lifestyle products are sold through multiple online and offline channels:

- Official websites warrix.co.th and warrix.com (free domestic shipping in Thailand for orders over 700 baht)
- Branded Warrix Shop retail stores — currently 18 locations across Thailand:
  - Warrix Shop BCC
  - Warrix Shop Stadium One
  - Warrix Shop Muang Thong
  - Warrix Shop Queen Sirikit Centre
  - Warrix Shop Siam Square
  - Warrix Shop The Mall Bang Khae
  - Warrix Shop The Mall Bangkapi
  - Warrix Shop Terminal 21 Korat
  - Warrix Shop Terminal 21 Pattaya
  - Warrix Shop Future Park Rangsit
  - Warrix Shop Muang Thong
  - Warrix Shop Market Village Suvarnabhumi
  - Warrix Shop Siam Premium Outlet
  - Warrix Shop Central Westgate
  - Warrix Shop Robinson Buriram
  - Warrix Shop Eastern Seaboard Industrial Estate
  - Warrix Shop Central Hat Yai
  - Warrix Shop Central Rama 9
- Major e-commerce platforms such as Shopee, Lazada and TikTok Shop
- International retail partners including warrix.my for the Malaysian market

== Sponsorships ==
=== Football ===
==== National teams ====
- Thailand 2017–2028
- Myanmar 2018–
- Indonesia 2020

In 2016 Warrix won the bid to manufacture kits for the Thailand national football team for a total of 400 million baht, under a contract running from 1 January 2017 to 31 December 2020. The first two kits — named Chayanuparb and Prabtrichak after legendary Thai warriors — debuted in a 2018 FIFA World Cup qualifying match against Saudi Arabia on 9 February 2017. Warrix subsequently won a renewed eight-year contract running from 1 January 2021 to 31 December 2028.

==== Clubs ====
- (Cambodia) Phnom Penh Crown FC
- (Laos) Lao Toyota 2013–
- (Malaysia) Melaka United 2018–
- (Malaysia) Negeri Sembilan
- (Malaysia) Kelantan Red Warrior
- (Malaysia) Melawati
- (Myanmar) Rakhine United
- (Singapore) Hougang United 2019–
- (Singapore) Tampines Rovers 2026–
- (Singapore) Tiong Bahru F.C. 2019
- Singapore Cricket Club 2019–
- (Thailand) Phlangkan 2025–
- (Thailand) Sukhothai 2025–
- (Thailand) Uthai Thani 2025–
- (Thailand) Lamphun Warrior 2023–
- (Thailand) Nakhon Si United 2022–
- (Thailand) Rayong 2021–
- (Thailand) BG Pathum United 2021–2023
- (Thailand) Songkhla 2021–2022
- (Thailand) Angthong 2018–2022
- (Thailand) Buriram United (AFC Champions League) 2018–
- (Thailand) Kalasin 2018–2019
- (Thailand) Nongbua Pitchaya 2018–
- (Thailand) Chainat Hornbill 2016–
- (Thailand) Pattaya United 2015
- (Thailand) Suphanburi 2015–2022
- (Thailand) PT Prachuap 2018–2021
- (Thailand) Udon Thani 2016–2017
- (Thailand) Nakhon Ratchasima 2014 - 2018
- (Thailand) BTU S.Boonmeerit United 2018–2019
- (Thailand) Si Mok 2018–2019
- (Thailand) PTT Rayong
- (Thailand) Simork

=== Referees ===
- AFF

=== Domestic leagues ===
Warrix provides its official balls for the following football association:

- Myanmar National League
