= Jaslee Hatta =

Singaporean footballer

Personal information
- Full name: Muhammad Jaslee bin Hatta
- Date of birth: 11 July 1981 (age 45)
- Place of birth: Singapore
- Height: 1.76 m (5 ft 9 1/2 in)
- Position: Defender

Team information
- Current team: Tanjong Pagar United (Academy manager)

Senior career*
Years	Team	Apps	(Gls)
1999–2000	SAFFC	0	(0)
2001	Tampines Rovers	21	(1)
2002	SAFFC	10	(0)
2003	Young Lions	6	(0)
2004–2005	Woodlands Wellington	38	(0)
2006–2011	Gombak United	153	(1)
2012–2014	Balestier Khalsa	60	(1)
Total		288	(3)

International career
2004–2014	Singapore	3	(0)

Managerial career
- 2015: GFA Sporting Westlake
- 2022: Mattar Sailors
- 2023–: Tanjong Pagar United (Academy manager)
- * Club domestic league appearances and goals

Muhammad Jaslee bin Hatta is a former Singapore international football player who plays for Balestier Khalsa. He is currently the academy manager of Singapore Premier League club Tanjong Pagar United.

== Club career ==
Previously, Jaslee played for SAFFC, Tampines Rovers, Young Lions, Woodlands Wellington and Gombak United.

== International career ==
Jaslee was selected for the Singapore national team in 2004 and earned 3 caps to date. Though called up by Radojko Avramović for the national squad, he has not played any games under him.

== Managerial career ==
After his retirement from football in 2014, Jaslee took up a coaching role for Singapore Football League club GFA Sporting Westlake.

In 2022, Jaslee took up SFL Division 2 club Mattar Sailors as their head coach.

In 2023, Jaslee was recruited by Singapore Premier League club Tanjong Pagar United to be their academy manager.

== Honours ==
=== International ===
Singapore

- ASEAN Football Championship: 2004

=== Club ===
Balestier Khalsa

- Singapore Cup: 2014
- League Cup: 2013
