= Securities and Exchange Commission of Thailand =

- Thai: สำนักงานคณะกรรมการกำกับหลักทรัพย์และตลาดหลักทรัพย์

Agency overview
- Formed: May 16, 1992; 34 years ago
- Jurisdiction: Thailand
- Headquarters: 333/3 Vibhavadi-Rangsit Road, Chomphon, Chatuchak, Bangkok, Thailand
- Agency executive: Pornanong Budsaratragoon, Secretary General
- Parent department: Ministry of Finance
- Key document: Securities and Exchange Act B.E. 2535
- Website: www.sec.gov.ph

The Securities and Exchange Commission of Thailand (SEC; Thai: สำนักงานคณะกรรมการกำกับหลักทรัพย์และตลาดหลักทรัพย์, RTGS: sam̌nákngan khna krnmkan kamkàp hlàk thrápy la tlàthlàkthrápy) is the agency of the Government of Thailand tasked with promoting, developing, and regulating the capital market of Thailand. It was created 16 May 1992 with the passage of the Securities and Exchange Act B.E. 2535.

== History ==
Modern securities trading in Thailand began with the founding of the Bangkok Stock Exchange in 1963, which in the end garnered limited attention and ceased operations in the early 1970s. In May 1974, after increased interest to establish a Thai stock exchange, the Securities Exchange of Thailand (SET) was established and began trading on 30 April 1975. On 1 January 1991 it was renamed to the Stock Exchange of Thailand (SET). The SET attracted foreign capital using various financial methods and was the primary regulator of securities markets until the founding of the SEC.

According to the SEC, "The dispersion of authority and supervision among several agencies and under several laws causes duplication of work, a lack of coherence and continuity." The increasing interest and foreign investment into the Thai market, combined with an influx in short-term speculation and a lack of investor protections, necessitated the creation of a new regulatory body for the trading of securities.

The Thai National Assembly signed the Securities and Exchange Act on 12 March 1992, and the Securities and Exchange Commission was established on 16 May 1992, with a centralized role for the regulation and development of both primary and secondary markets.

Since then, three other laws have been introduced to help support the development of the capital market: the Derivatives Act B.E. 2546 (2003); the Trust for Transactions in Capital Market B.E. 2550 (2007), the Emergency Decree on Digital Asset Businesses B.E. 2561 (2018).

== See also ==
- Stock Exchange of Thailand
- Government of Thailand
- Ministry of Finance (Thailand)
- Market for Alternative Investment
