= Sea Ltd =

Singaporean technology company

Sea Limited
- Trade name: Sea Ltd
- Type: Public
- Traded as: NYSE: SE
- ISIN: US81141R1005
- Industry: Conglomerate
- Founded: 2009; 17 years ago as Garena; 2017; 9 years ago as Sea Ltd
- Founder: Forrest Li
- Headquarters: 1 Fusionopolis Place, #17-10, Galaxis, Singapore 138522
- Area served: Worldwide
- Key people: Forrest Li (Founder CEO and Chairman); Chris Feng (President); Gang Ye (COO)
- Products: E-commerce; Entertainment; Digital financial services
- Revenue: US$16.8 billion (2024)
- Net income: US$444 million (2024)
- Owners: (As per 30 June 2024): Tencent (18.4 %), Baillie Gifford & Co. (6.45%), Forrest Li (3.67%), Tiger Global Management LLC (2.84%), BlackRock Fund Advisors (2.06%), Sands Capital Management LLC (1.76%)
- Subsidiaries: Garena; Lion City Sailors FC; MariBank; MariBank Philippines; Monee; SeaBank Indonesia; Shopee
- Website: sea.com

Sea Limited (stylized as: sea) is a tech conglomerate headquartered in Singapore. It is listed on the New York Stock Exchange, with revenue of US$16.8 billion (2024). Sea currently functions as a holding company for Garena, Monee and Shopee, the largest e-commerce platform in Southeast Asia.

Since 2020, Sea is also the owner of Singapore Premier League football club Lion City Sailors FC, after Forrest Li acquired, privatised and renamed Home United.

== History ==
=== 2009–2015 ===
The company initially named Garena was established by Forrest Li in Singapore in 2009. In 2010, Riot Games awarded the publishing rights of League of Legends (LoL) to the company, for the game’s first launch in Southeast Asia.

By 2014, Garena was valued at US$1 billion by The World Startup Report and was ranked as the largest internet company in Singapore by The Economist. In March 2015, the Ontario Teachers' Pension Plan (OTPP), one of the largest pension funds in the world, invested in Garena, increasing the value of the company to over US$2.5 billion.

=== Transition to Sea Limited ===
In May 2017, after raising US$550 million in a funding round, Garena underwent a corporate rebranding. The parent company adopted the name Sea Ltd. to better reflect its diverse range of businesses, which now includes digital entertainment, e-commerce, and digital financial services. The company's digital entertainment segment retained the Garena name, maintaining its brand identity in the gaming industry.

=== 2017–present ===
Sea listed on the New York Stock Exchange in 2017, where it was the first major U.S. IPO from a Southeast Asian tech firm. In 2020, Sea joined the Infocomm Media Development Authority (IMDA) in Singapore to hire and train 500 Singaporeans in technical roles over the course of two years. It was the largest company-led training initiative under IMDA's TechSkills Accelerator program. In 2021, Sea gave a S$50 million gift to the National University of Singapore's (NUS) School of Computing for research and education in areas such as artificial intelligence and data science, making it the largest corporate gift the university had received. Sea and NUS officially opened two new buildings in January 2025, the Sea Building and Sea Connect, at the NUS School of Computing. On 9 September 2021, Sea raised US$6 billion in an equity and convertible bond sale, making it Southeast Asia's largest fund raising. Sea said it planned to use the cash for strategic investments and potential acquisitions.

In January 2022, Tencent, the Chinese gaming giant, offloaded a US$3 billion investment in Sea. In the same year, Sea discontinued its investment division and ceased new equity investments.

In March 2023, Sea opened its digital bank, Maribank, after securing a digital full bank license from Monetary Authority of Singapore. It also owned banking license in Malaysia, Indonesia and Philippines. In 2025, Maribank launched a new banking group to expand digital banking services in Southeast Asia.

In March 2024, Sea posted its first profitable year since its IPO with an annual net income of US$162.7 million for the 2023 financial year.

In August 2025, Sea signed an agreement with OpenAI to increase AI adoption scross Southeast Asia, including the use of ChatGPT Plus for VIP users in Indonesia, Thailand, and Vietnam. In 2026, the firm expanded its partnership with OpenAI by launching the first regional Codex Hackathon series across the Asia Pacific, as well as expanding their collaboration on AI initiatives across Southeast Asia and Brazil, and offering ChatGPT for Business to sellers on Shopee.

In February 2026, Sea finalized a partnership with Google to develop AI tools for gaming, e-commerce, and managing payments.

In April 2026, Sea established the Artificial Intelligence Center of Excellence (AI CoE) in Singapore. This new AI research center was supported by the Infocomm Media Development Authority, the joint office of the Economic Development Board, Enterprise Singapore and the Digital Industry Singapore (DISG), a joint office of the Economic Development Board.

== Subsidiaries ==
=== Shopee ===
Shopee is a technology company focused mainly on e-commerce. Shopee was first launched in Singapore in 2015, and has grown to become the largest e-commerce platform in Southeast Asia and Taiwan. The company also serves consumers and sellers throughout Southeast Asia (Singapore, Malaysia, Thailand, Philippines, Vietnam, Indonesia), Taiwan, and Brazil.

=== Monee ===
Monee (formerly known as SeaMoney) is an internet services company specialized in digital payments and financial services. It's offerings include mobile wallet services, payment processing, credit offerings and related digital financial products and services. These are available in seven markets across Southeast Asia and Taiwan under various brands, including ShopeePay, SPayLater, SLoan, SeaBank, and MariBank. Monee's loan book exceeded $5 billion in 2025, at the time of the rebranding. Sea Chairman and CEO Forrest Li stated the name Monee was chosen because "it is simple, cute, and just like Sea, easy to write and pronounce."

On May 8, 2025, the SeaMoney rebranding to Monee occurred alongside the opening of Monee's global headquarters for digital financial services at Rochester Commons in Singapore. As part of the expansion, Monee will be investing in product management, artificial intelligence and anti-money laundering.

=== Garena ===
Garena operates as the digital entertainment division of Sea, managing Garena+, an online gaming and social platform established in 2010. This platform facilitates the discovery, download, and play of online games. Garena distributes game titles in various countries across Southeast Asia and Taiwan, including MOBA game Heroes of Newerth, the first-person shooter game Point Blank, the mobile MOBA game Arena of Valor and the mobile racing game Speed Drifters.

In 2017, Garena developed Free Fire, an online action-adventure game that became the most downloaded game on the Google Play Store in 2019.

Following a decline in profit in 2022, Sea reported that it had stabilized the performance of its digital entertainment business in 2023. The company indicated that Garena had maintained steady demand for its popular title, Free Fire, which achieved a peak of over 100 million daily active users in February 2024.
