= List of game companies in Singapore =

This is a list of game companies with offices in Singapore.

== A–H ==
- Adsumsoft
- Alpha Beta Omega
- Armaggeddon (hardware)
- Asiasoft Online
- Asylum House
- AT-AT Games (publisher & dev)
- Bandai Namco Entertainment (Tokyo HQ; publisher & dev.)
  - Bandai Namco Studios Singapore (dev & co-dev)
- Battlebrew Productions
- Blizzard Entertainment (marketing)
- Boomzap Entertainment
- Cargo Studio (incubator)
- Cherry Credits (publisher/payment provider acquired by Shanda)
- COGNOSPHERE PTE. LTD. (mobile)
- Daylight Studios
- Delta Duck Studios
- DeNA
- Electronic Arts (Marketing/Services, etc.)
- Elementa Games Pte. Ltd. (Subsidiary of Chinese-Japanese firm, Happy Elements)
- Erabit Studios (Publisher & dev. HQ.)
- Farlight Pte. Ltd (Publishing brand of mob & online games dev, Lilith Games. Also dev.)
- Finute
- Forever Young Studio (creative agency, has made games in the past)
- FunPlus (SG branch. Publisher of XII Braves games)
- Fusion Interactive Pte. Ltd. (Publisher & dev. Core & web games. Not same as namesake US dev.)
- GAMBIT Game Lab (Part of Singapore-MIT)
- Game Reign Pte Ltd
- Garena (Publisher & dev. Online games.)
- GatherRound Studios
- Gattai Games
- GCL Global Holdings Company (Holding group)
  - 4Divinity Pte. Ltd. (Publishing Subsidiary)
  - Epicsoft Asia Pte. Ltd. (Distribution Subsidiary)
- General Arcade (Porting House. HQ.)
- General Interactive Co. (Publisher & dev)
- Go Game
- Goldpact Goblins (Publisher, consultancy)
- GRYPHLINE (Ex-Gryph Frontier in 2022-2023. Global publisher of Chinese firm, Hypergryph Network Technology.)
- Gumi Inc. (Mobile games)

== I–Q ==
- I Got Games (IGG)
- IFUN Games
- IMBA Interactive (Music & audio recording)
- Infinity Core (Singapore)
- Infold Games (Singaporean publishing subsidiary of Chinese dev, Papergames)
- Interactive Digital Dreams Pte Ltd
- Inzen Studio (Mobile games. Invested in by Baidu.)
- Jaysonite Studios
- Joysteak Studios
- Kepler Interactive (Publisher. Co-HQ.)
  - Kepler Ghost (Publisher)
- KOEX studio
- kopiforge
- L.A.I Singapore Pte Ltd (Coin-op distributor)
- Lambda Mu (games published by Chillingo)
- LandShark Games
- Leoful (Publisher)
- Level Infinite (Publishing brand of Tencent Games. Mostly mobile.)
- Lionfish Studios
- Lionstork Studios
- LUCK-IT
- Magma Studios Pte Ltd
- Mercat Games
- Mighty Bear Games
- Mikoishi Studios
- MYTONA Pte Ltd. (Founded in Yakutsk in 2012. NZ HQ. Publisher.)
- Nabi Studios (Relocated)
- Nexgen Studio Pte Ltd (Advergaming)
- Oddity Studios Pte Ltd (Mobile games & IT solutions firm)
- Okami Studio (Publisher & dev: online games)
- Outstanding Game Pte Ltd (Mobile games)
- PD Design Studio Pte Ltd (Publisher & dev)
- Personae Studios L.L.P. (Publisher & dev: mobile games. Also AI & IoT.)
- Planet Arkadia Pte Ltd
- Playware Studios
- Polywick Studio
- Potato Play
- Project 99 (Publisher & dev: core & mobile games)
- Qooland Games (Publisher & dev: core & mobile games)

== R–Z ==
- Ratloop (Ratloop Asia)
- Razer (Hardware)
- Reckoner Industries
- Red Hare Studios
- Riot Games
- Rock Nano Private Ltd
- Rotten Mage
- Sea Ltd (Tech; consumer Internet firm)
  - Garena (Publisher & dev: online, mobile games)
- Secret base
- Secretlab (Gaming furniture specialist)
- Soft Source Publishing (Aka Soft Source Pte Ltd. Publisher.)
- Sony Computer Entertainment (publishing)
- Spiral Up Games (publishing)
- Springloaded Pte. Ltd. (Publisher & dev)
- Sweet Sweet Game
- SYPHONO4 PTE. LTD.
- Take-Two Interactive
- Tecmo Koei
- Teng Yun Technology Pte. Ltd. Casino Game
- TENDAYS STUDIO
- The Gentlebros (Dev's games)
- The Iterative Collective (Publisher)
- Touch Dimensions Interactive (Founded 2011. Inactive in 2018. Publisher & dev.)
- Ubisoft Singapore
- Unity Technologies (Engine developer. SG branch.)
- Vinova Pte Ltd
- Virtuos (HQ. Dev, co-dev, porting, 3D art, testing.)
- Weike Gaming Technology (Gambling hardware)
- XII Braves (Their developed mobile games are published by FunPlus)
- Ysbryd Games (Publisher. Also UK based.)
- YYZ Productions
- Zengami Pte Ltd
- Zeevium Games (Dev & co-dev: Games, AR/VR, interactivity)

== Defunct companies ==
- Booster Pack Pte. Ltd (Defunct)
- Chariots Gaming (Mobile games. Founded 2019. Inactive after 2020.)
- Fntastic Pte. Ltd. (Singaporean HQ. Founded 2015. Closed 2023.)
- GToken (Partially owned by Manny Pacquiao. Mobile publisher. Founded 2012. Closed 2022.)
- Happy Labs Pte Ltd (Mobile games. Founded 2012. Inactive after 2020.)
- Ixora Studios (Mobile games. Founded 2012. Closed after 2015. Website down in 2019.)
- Kaiju Den Pte Ltd (Defunct)
- Lucasarts (Lucasarts Singapore now defunct)
- Meta.us (eSports networking. Founded 2020. Inactive after 2022.)
- Nonstop games (Defunct, acquired by King (company) in 2014)
- Nubee (defunct)
- Real U Pte Ltd (defunct)
- Sparkjumpers (Mobile games. Founded 2012. Inactive in 2018.)
- Think! Studio (Mobile games. Founded 2008. Defunct 2017.)
- Van der Veer Games (Mobile games. Former tabletop publisher. Founded 1998. Inactive after 2020.)
- Witching Hour Studios (Founded 2010. Inactive in 2018.)
- XYZ Wave Pte Ltd (AR & video game tech. Founded 2009. Inactive in 2023.)

== See also ==
- Lists of companies
- gamedevmap
