= Made in Thailand e-Sports =

Professional esports organization based in Thailand

- Short name: MiTH
- Divisions: Heroes of Newerth; Counter-Strike: Global Offensive; Point Blank; FIFA Online 3 Starcraft II; Special Force II; Heroes of the Storm; Playerunknown's Battlegrounds
- Founded: 2012
- Location: Thailand
- Partners: Nvidia; DXRacer; G2A; Zowie Monitor by BenQ; SteelSeries; MSI; TESA
- Website: www.mithesports.com

Made in Thailand e-Sports (MiTH) is a professional esports organization based in Thailand. It was founded in 2012 by Chanignun Thipairote.

== History ==
The beginning of the organization came from the event that Chanignun Thipairote had seen the E-Sports of other countries, and they were better than Thailand. Then he decided to make a team. The first team that joined MiTh was MiTh. GC (GlamoRous Crazy), which was the Point Bank champion of Thailand at that time and win the PBIC tournament in 2011. After that, the organization grew and a lot of sponsors supported them. The organization is sponsored by NVIDIA, BenQ, MSi, G2a.com, SteelSeries and OCZ Stotrage Solutions. The organization now has MiTH.Hybrid for Hero of Newerth, MiTh.HEROES for Heroes of the Storm, MiTH.GlamoRousCrazy for Point Bank, Mith CS:GO for Counter-Strike: Global Offensive, MiTH.tAf for Special Force 2. MiTh also have the individual players for Fifa Online 3 and Starcraft II.

== Honours ==
This is a list of honours for the Made in Thailand E-sport.

=== MiTH.OHP ===
- 1st HoN HoT Tournament 2011
- 1st HoN Fire Inferno Tournament 2011
- 1st ASRock HoN Tournament Season 1
- 1st ASRock HoN Tournament Season 2
- 1st DreamHoN 2012: Thailand Qualifier
- 1st HoN Rookie Cup 2012
- 1st HoN Thai 2 DreamHack Tournament
- 2nd Garena HoN Championships Season#1 2011
- 2nd G-League – March 2013
- 3rd HoN THUNDER EDGE TOURNAMENT
- 3rd HoN Thai 2 DreamHack Tournament BIG Festival 2012
- 7th Garena HON Star League 2012

=== MiTH.s2y ===
- 1st HoN Tour Grand Final 2013 (แชมป์ประเทศไทย)
- 1st HoN SEA Tournament Circle 2
- 1st HoN SEA Dreamhack Qualify to Sweden (แชมป์ SEA)
- 1st HoN SEA Tournament Grand final 2014
- 1st HoN World Tour 2014 at GSL 2014 Bitec Bangna
- 1st HoN Road To DreamHack Summer 2013 (ได้สิทธิ์ตัวแทนประเทศไทย)
- 2nd HoN Bangkok Tournament 2012
- 2nd HoN G-League เดือน พฤษภาคม 2013
- 3rd HoN G-League เดือน กุมภาพันธ์ 2013
- 3rd HoN G-League เดือน มีนาคม 2013
- 3rd HoN Garena Star League 2013
- 5th HoN Dreamhack (Sweden)
- 5th HoN Tour World Final @Garena Star League 2014

=== Counter-Strike : Global Offensive ===
This is a list of Achievement 2014-2016

- 1st GIGABYTE CS:GO Tournament #1
- 1st BenQ CS:GO Championship 2014
- 1st CS:GO UNITRY PRE-SEASON 2014
- 1st BenQ CS:GO XL Series Tournament January 2015
- 1st SteelSeries CS:GO Tournament
- 1st EXL CS:GO Tournament ภาคใต้
- 1st CS:GO EXL 2015 : Grand Final (LAN Event Thailand Championship 2015)
- 1st Thailand represent to AGES 2016 Malaysia (LAN Event)
- 1st Sports Illustrated eSports CS:GO INVITATION CUP (LAN Event)
- 1st eXTREMESLAND ZOWIE Asia CS:GO 2016 (Thailand qualify LAN Event)
- 2nd CS:GO Pre-Season 2014
- 2nd CS:GO Twin Frag Tournament LAN by BenQ & SteelSeries
- 2nd Zowie CS:GO Challenge#1
- 2nd AGES 2016 Lan Grand Final (LAN Event @Malaysia)
- 2nd WirForce CSGO LAN Party 2016 (LAN Event @Chinese Taipei)

Achievement 2017

- 1st ZOWIE CS:GO Challenge#7 (LAN)
- 1st 9th Esport 2017 World Championship Qualifier (LAN)

[ได้สิทธิ์เป็นตัวแทนทีมชาติไทยไปต่องาน IeSF + Predator Helios 300 มูลค่า 49,990 บาท]

- 4th FPSThailand x SteelSeries Pro League by Twitch Season #1

=== MiTH.Flashdive ===
- 1st : League of Legends Thailand Grand Final 2013
- 1st : League of Legends Thailand Championship Series : Pro League 2
- 1st : League of Legends Folk League Tournament #1 By Gview
- 1st : League of Legends Road to WCG 2013
- 2nd : League of Legends Thailand Championship Series : Road To World Season 3
- 2nd : LoL Pro league Winter Season 2014
- 2nd : LoL Pro League Spring Season 2014
- 3rd : LoL Pro League 2014 – Summer Season
- 4th : League of Legends Thailand Grand Final 2014
