= Roco Kingdom =

Chinese video game franchise

Roco Kingdom 洛克王国: 世界
- Developer: Morefun Studios
- Publisher: Morefun Studios
- Engine: Unreal Engine 4
- Platforms: Android; iOS; Windows; PS5; Xbox Series X/S
- Release: CN: March 26, 2026; WW: TBA
- Genre: RPG / creature-collecting
- Modes: Single-player, multiplayer

Roco Kingdom (browser game)
- Developer: Morefun Studios
- Publisher: Tencent Games
- Engine: Adobe Flash, HTML5
- Platform: Web browser
- Release: July 15, 2010
- Genre: Role-playing game
- Modes: Single-player, multiplayer

Roco Kingdom (Chinese: 洛克王国) is a free-to-play open-world creature-collecting role-playing game franchise developed by Morefun Studios, a subsidiary of Tencent Games. The Roco Kingdom franchise began with a browser game in 2010.

The video game Roco Kingdom launched in mainland China in March 2026. A worldwide version is forthcoming for PC, consoles. Tencent stated that the game surpassed 30 million registered users within nine days, and ranked first among mobile games newly released in China in 2026 in both average daily active users and gross receipts. A worldwide version is forthcoming for PC, consoles, and mobile devices, with its first global closed beta scheduled to begin on 27 October 2026.

== History ==
The original Roco Kingdom browser game entered public testing in China in 2010. Morefun Studios developed the 2026 game as a new three-dimensional, open-world entry in the franchise.

In 2012, Roco Kingdom: Martial Arts Tournament received the China Animation & Comic Competition Golden Dragon Award for best screenplay in the category of animations.

In 2015, Roco Kingdom 4 broke sales records in China for domestically produced animated films.

In its preview of the worldwide version, PC Gamer highlighted the simulated creature behaviours, shared-world structure, and the absence of paid creature acquisition as distinguishing features within the creature-collecting genre.

The project was publicly revealed in 2022 and underwent several tests in China from 2024 onward.

The game launched in mainland China on 26 March 2026 for Windows, iOS, Android, and HarmonyOS NEXT, with cross-platform progression. Its business model is free-to-play with optional purchases.

Morefun Studios announced the worldwide version at Gamescom Opening Night Live on 25 August 2026. The worldwide release is planned for Windows through Steam and other PC storefronts, PlayStation 5, Xbox Series X/S, iOS, and Android. Store listings describe support for online cooperative play, online player-versus-player modes, and cross-platform multiplayer. The first worldwide closed beta test, called the "Quack Quack Test", is scheduled for 27 October 2026 on PC, iOS, and Android. The full worldwide release date remains unannounced.

== Game elements ==
=== Gameplay ===
Roco Kingdom is set on Carosia, where the player takes the role of a student at a magic academy. Its main progression loop combines open-world exploration, creature collection, team building, and turn-based combat. More than 400 Jini species are available in the Chinese release and have been announced for the worldwide version.

=== Jinies ===
Jinies occupy different habitats and can display species-specific behaviours and interactions with their surroundings. Individual creatures of the same species may also vary in physical characteristics such as height, build, and weight. Players can capture Jinies encountered in the world, train them, and assemble teams for battles against computer-controlled opponents or other players.

=== Turn-Based Combat ===
Combat uses an 18-class type-matchup system. The player selects skills using a shared energy resource, creating a trade-off between immediate attacks and conserving or restoring energy. Player-versus-player battles equalize Jini levels, shifting their emphasis toward team composition, type matchups, skill selection, and anticipating an opponent's actions. Morefun Studios has said that Jinies are obtainable through play and that the competitive mode does not use pay-to-win mechanics.

=== Multi-Player Mode ===
The game can be played alone or online with other players. Multiplayer activities include cooperative exploration and challenges, visiting other players' homes, farming, and riding some Jinies together. The worldwide version is planned to support cross-platform multiplayer across PC, consoles, and mobile devices.

=== Backstory ===
The Kingdom of Rocos is located inside a basin close to the sea. The Rocos have lived there along with a variety of other creatures since prehistoric times and rule their land through magic. They have specialized into merchants, detectives, gardeners, explorers, and knights. Roco Kingdom began transitioning into an open world model in 2023.

=== Main characters ===
Roco is the main protagonist controlled by the player. Notable non-player characters include St. Andrew the king and Griffin, the headmaster of the magic academy.

=== Cross-marketing ===
Characters from other franchises such as Cardcaptor Sakura, Digimon, and Sanrio appear in Roco Kingdom during certain events.

== Films ==
=== Feature films ===
- Roco Kingdom: Sacred Dragon Knight: Directed by Yu Shengjun, produced by Tencent, Youyang Media, and XuanDong Animation, premiered on September 30, 2011.
- Roco Kingdom: The Desire of Dragon: Directed by Yu Shengjun, produced by Tencent and Youyang Media, premiered on January 31, 2013. The producers hoped that Roco Kingdom as a franchise could compete with domestic and foreign brands such as Kung Fu Panda, McDull, and Pleasant Goat. The film earned 32 million RMB in its opening week.
- Roco Kingdom 3: The Sacred Dragon's Guardian: Premiered on July 10, 2014.
- Roco Kingdom 4: Departure! Valley of Giants: Released on August 13, 2015.

=== Television films ===
- Roco Kingdom: Martial Arts Tournament: Tells the story of Rocky and his friends participating in the Roco Kingdom Martial Arts Tournament, premiered on July 13, 2012.
- Roco Kingdom: Adventure on Xuan Yu Island: One day, a mysterious event occurs in the peaceful Roco Kingdom. Three mysterious pets appear on Xuan Yu Island, and brave Rocky sets off alone on an adventure to uncover the truth. Released in 2013.
- Roco Kingdom: The Triumph of Light: Rocky, Dimo, and Princess Keri face trials and open the gates of the Sacred Temple of Light. However, they find themselves in a black-and-white world, where everything—including the ground, sky, and even the pets—has turned into white stones. Released during the 2013 anniversary celebration.
- Roco Kingdom: The Legend of Resurrection: Rocky and his friends discover a mysterious resurrection scroll in the Crystal Cavern. The scroll states that finding three magical artifacts will allow the resurrection of any life form, but the scroll is stolen by Enzo. To prevent Enzo from using it to awaken powerful demons and attack the kingdom, the young heroes decide to take action to stop his evil plot.
- Roco Kingdom: Divine Pet Chronicles: A compilation of the above four animated films, it debuted on November 25, 2014.

== TV series ==
=== Animations ===
- Roco Kingdom Adventure: Locke and his friends study at the Magic Academy in Roco Kingdom. The series debuted in August 2013.
- Roco Kingdom Adventure 2: Enzo's Diary: The sequel to Roco Kingdom Adventure, it debuted in April 2014.
- Roco Kingdom Adventure 3: The Eight Great Medals: Locke and his friends improve their skills in order to win a tournament at the Magic Academy. The series debuted in June 2015.

=== Live-action ===
- Roco Kingdom Magic Academy: The Mysterious Melody: A Chinese live-action TV series, it began airing every Friday on Hunan Golden Eagle Cartoon TV starting from June 13, 2014.

== Musicals ==
Roco Kingdom Adventure was a musical produced by the China National Theatre for Children, first performed from May 31 to June 2, 2013. In 2014, it was performed at the Great Hall of the People on June 1, on the campuses of ten renowned schools in Beijing such as the Beijing Haidian Foreign Language Shi Yan School, and 66 times across 25 cities in China.

== See also ==
- Browser game
- Virtual world
- Mole Manor
- Seer (franchise)
