= S2 Games =

American video game developer

- Company type: Video game developer
- Industry: Video games
- Founded: 2003
- Defunct: 2018
- Headquarters: Rohnert Park, California, Kalamazoo, Michigan
- Products: Savage: The Battle for Newerth; Savage 2: A Tortured Soul; Heroes of Newerth; Strife; Savage Resurrection; Brawl of Ages
- Number of employees: 22 (2015)

S2 Games was a video game development company which was founded by Marc "Maliken" DeForest, Jesse Hayes, and Sam McGrath, based in Rohnert Park, California. They also had a development location in Kalamazoo, Michigan.

== History ==
Their first project (a real-time strategy, third-person shooter and role-playing game hybrid), Savage: The Battle for Newerth, was released in the Summer of 2003. They released its sequel, Savage 2: A Tortured Soul, on January 16, 2008, and independently published and distributed it. Their third installment in the Savage series, Heroes of Newerth, based heavily around Defense of the Ancients, was released on May 12, 2010.

In 2015, S2 Games sold the rights to Heroes of Newerth to Garena to focus on Strife, their second-generation MOBA.

Garena subsequently moved Heroes of Newerth to Frostburn Studios, a Kalamazoo, Michigan based subsidiary of Garena.

== Titles ==
- Savage: The Battle for Newerth (2003) (Windows, Macintosh, Linux)
- Savage 2: A Tortured Soul (2008) (Windows, Macintosh, Linux)
- Heroes of Newerth (2010) (Windows, Macintosh, Linux)
- Strife (2015) (Windows, Macintosh, Linux)
- Savage Resurrection (2016) (Windows)
- Brawl of Ages (2017) (Windows)

== Key events ==
- In 2003, S2 Games released Savage: The Battle for Newerth, their first commercial game.
- In 2004, three former S2 Games employees left the company to form Offset Software.
- In 2006, S2 Games re-released Savage: The Battle for Newerth, as freeware.
- In 2008, S2 Games released Savage 2: A Tortured Soul.
- In 2009, S2 Games re-released Savage 2: A Tortured Soul as freeware.
- In 2010, S2 Games released Heroes of Newerth.
- In 2011, S2 Games re-released Heroes of Newerth as freeware/free-to-play.
- In 2012, S2 Games made all heroes in Heroes of Newerth completely free for online play.
- In 2012, over 10,000,000 Heroes of Newerth user accounts had been registered.
- In 2013, S2 Games announced Strife, an upcoming "second generation MOBA".
- In 2015, S2 Games sold the property of Heroes of Newerth from its label into the hands of Garena and Frostburn Studios.
- In 2017, Savage Resurrection was re-released under a free-to-play model.
