= 2015 Vietnam Championship Series A Spring Season =

Video game competition

2015 VCS A Spring
- 2015

Tournament information
- Sport: League of Legends
- Dates: 15 November 2014–6 April 2015
- Administrator: Garena Vietnam
- Host: Vietnam
- Teams: 16

Final positions
- Champions: Saigon Fantastic Five
- Runner-up: Saigon Jokers

The 2015 Vietnam Championship Series A Spring Season is the fourth split of the first season of Vietnam's fully professional League of Legends. After the changing of 2015 GPL Spring, VCS A is also changing their format. Teams that joining GPL should also join VCS A.

== Format ==
- 16 qualified teams.

- 3 teams from 2014 GPL Summer.
- 6 teams from 2014 VCS A Summer .
- 1 team from 2014 VCS B Summer.
- 6 teams from Qualifiers.

- Round robin format.
- Each match is best of one.
- Each team plays all of the other teams twice
- Top 6 teams receive a spot for 2015 GPL Summer.

== Participants ==
| Team(s) | ID |
|---|---|
| (Vietnam) Boba Marines | BM |
| (Vietnam) 269 Gaming | 269 |
| (Vietnam) Hanoi Fate | HF |
| (Vietnam) Saigon Fantastic Five | SF5 |
| (Vietnam) Aces Gaming | ACE |
| (Vietnam) Saigon Jokers | SAJ |
| (Vietnam) ZOTAC Dung Club | ZOT |
| (Vietnam) Full Louis | FL |
| (Vietnam) Hanoi Dragons | HND |
| (Vietnam) Ultimate | UTM |
| (Vietnam) Saigon Dai Binh | DB |
| (Vietnam) Hanoi SkyRed | HSR |
| (Vietnam) Hanoi Phoenix | HNP |
| (Vietnam) Danang Elements | DNE |
| (Vietnam) Hanoi Vikings | HNV |
| (Vietnam) Saigon Xgame | XG |

=== Rosters ===
| Teams | Players | | | | |
| Teams | Top | Jungle | Mid | ADC | Support |
|---|---|---|---|---|---|
| Boba Marines | (Vietnam) Gony | (Vietnam) Augustus | (Vietnam) QTV | (Vietnam) Archie | (Vietnam) Junie |
| 269 Gaming | (Vietnam) Crom (Vietnam) KingJ | (Vietnam) MindGame (Vietnam) Sacrifice (Vietnam) Destroy (Vietnam) Heaven | (Vietnam) Beyond | (Vietnam) Celebrity | (Vietnam) Sergh |
| Aces Gaming | (Vietnam) Lamborghini (Vietnam) Sasuke | (Vietnam) Heaven | (Vietnam) Thone | (Vietnam) An (Vietnam) Hydro | (Vietnam) Esolar (Vietnam) Luffy (Vietnam) Mazino |
| Saigon Dai Binh | (Vietnam) StingBoy | (Vietnam) Kidz | (Vietnam) TienGau | (Vietnam) Randy | (Vietnam) Sunny (Vietnam) Lord |
| Hanoi Phoenix | (Vietnam) Row | (Vietnam) Lovels (Vietnam) SkyT | (Vietnam) Sun | (Vietnam) Potm | (Vietnam) Miuky (Vietnam) Dai |
| Hanoi Fate | (Vietnam) Lolita (Vietnam) Shady | (Vietnam) MeoU | (Vietnam) Jinky | (Vietnam) Slay (Vietnam) Lysna | (Vietnam) Akiho |
| Hanoi Dragons | (Vietnam) JetTrue | (Vietnam) Hyo Jinn (Vietnam) Sena (Vietnam) Kid | (Vietnam) iloda | (Vietnam) Kai | (Vietnam) TQK |
| Danang Elements | (Vietnam) Lalmirch (Vietnam) Destiny | (Vietnam) Pain (Vietnam) TunCoi | (Vietnam) Zafes | (Vietnam) Holmes | (Vietnam) Ryo (Vietnam) Warz |
| Full Louis | (Vietnam) Starfall | (Vietnam) KoW | (Vietnam) Shyn | (Vietnam) Tartarus | (Vietnam) Violet |
| Saigon Fantastic Five | (Vietnam) Auzeze (Vietnam) Shady | (Vietnam) Jinkey (Vietnam) Yushin | (Vietnam) Optimus (Vietnam) Carrot | (Vietnam) Minas | (Vietnam) Uzi |
| Saigon Jokers | (Vietnam) Nixwater | (Vietnam) Safety | (Vietnam) Lovida (Vietnam) Carrot | (Vietnam) Prince | (Vietnam) Tsu (Vietnam) Yushin |
| Hanoi SkyRed | (Vietnam) StormEye | (Vietnam) HianRy | (Vietnam) Es | (Vietnam) Chen (Vietnam) HeOpeO | (Vietnam) Rua |
| Ultimate | (Vietnam) Ness | (Vietnam) Tarzan | (Vietnam) Lucifer (Vietnam) Gil | (Vietnam) BeeOne | (Vietnam) Tear |
| Hanoi Vikings | (Vietnam) Shinichi (Vietnam) Mew (Vietnam) Starfall | (Vietnam) Xchanging | (Vietnam) Scary (Vietnam) poker (Vietnam) Canabis (Vietnam) Tentei | (Vietnam) Berzerker | (Vietnam) phahoai (Vietnam) 2605 |
| Saigon Xgame | (Vietnam) Brian (Vietnam) Lucky | (Vietnam) Hustle (Vietnam) Arest | (Vietnam) Lightning | (Vietnam) Young | (Vietnam) Puru |
| ZOTAC Dung Club | (Vietnam) Simba (Vietnam) Ren | (Vietnam) Exo | (Vietnam) Henry | (Vietnam) Kirito | (Vietnam) TQ (Vietnam) BaRoiBeo |

== Results ==
=== Group stage ===
- Round robin format.
- Each match is best of one.
- Each team plays all of the other teams twice

| # | Team | ~ | SF5 | SAJ | BM | ZOT | FL | HF | HND | UTM | 269 | DB | HSR | HNP | DNE | HNV | ACE | XG | W | L | ± |
|---|---|---|---|---|---|---|---|---|---|---|---|---|---|---|---|---|---|---|---|---|---|
| 1 | Saigon Fantastic Five | SF5 | ~ | 2−0 | 2−0 | 1−1 | 2−0 | 2−0 | 2−0 | 2−0 | 2−0 | 0−2 | 2−0 | 2−0 | 2−0 | 2−0 | 2−0 | 2−0 | 27 | 3 | +24 |
| 2 | Saigon Jokers | SAJ | 0−2 | ~ | 1−1 | 1−1 | 2−0 | 1−1 | 2−0 | 2−0 | 1−1 | 2−0 | 2−0 | 2−0 | 2−0 | 2−0 | 2−0 | 2−0 | 24 | 6 | +16 |
| 3 | ZOTAC Dung Club | ZOT | 1−1 | 1−1 | ~ | 1−1 | 1−1 | 2−0 | 1−1 | 2−0 | 1−1 | 2−0 | 1−1 | 2−0 | 2−0 | 2−0 | 2−0 | 2−0 | 23 | 7 | +16 |
| 4 | Boba Marines | BM | 0−2 | 1−1 | 1−1 | ~ | 1−1 | 1−1 | 2−0 | 1−1 | 1−1 | 2−0 | 2−0 | 2−0 | 2−0 | 2−0 | 2−0 | 2−0 | 22 | 8 | +14 |
| 5 | Full Louis | FL | 0−2 | 0−2 | 1−1 | 1−1 | ~ | 1−1 | 1−1 | 2−0 | 2−0 | 1−1 | 1−1 | 2−0 | 2−0 | 2−0 | 2−0 | 2−0 | 20 | 10 | +10 |
| 6 | Hanoi Fate | HF | 0−2 | 1−1 | 0−2 | 1−1 | 1−1 | ~ | 1−1 | 1−1 | 1−1 | 2−0 | 2−0 | 0−2 | 2−0 | 2−0 | 2−0 | 2−0 | 18 | 12 | +6 |
| 7 | Hanoi Dragons | HND | 0−2 | 0−2 | 2−0 | 0−2 | 0−2 | 1−1 | ~ | 1−1 | 2−0 | 1−1 | 2−0 | 1−1 | 2−0 | 2−0 | 2−0 | 1−1 | 17 | 13 | +4 |
| 8 | Ultimate | UTM | 0−2 | 0−2 | 0−2 | 1−1 | 0−2 | 1−1 | 1−1 | ~ | 2−0 | 1−1 | 1−1 | 2−0 | 2−0 | 2−0 | 2−0 | 2−0 | 17 | 13 | +4 |
| 9 | 269 Gaming | 269 | 0−2 | 1−1 | 1−1 | 1−1 | 0−2 | 1−1 | 0−2 | 0−2 | ~ | 1−1 | 2−0 | 2−0 | 2−0 | 1−1 | 2−0 | 2−0 | 16 | 14 | +2 |
| 10 | Saigon Dai Binh | DB | 2−0 | 1−1 | 0−2 | 0−2 | 1−1 | 0−2 | 1−1 | 1−1 | 1−1 | ~ | 1−1 | 1−1 | 0−2 | 1−1 | 2−0 | 2−0 | 14 | 16 | −2 |
| 11 | Hanoi SkyRed | HSR | 0−2 | 0−2 | 1−1 | 0−2 | 0−2 | 0−2 | 0−2 | 1−1 | 0−2 | 1−1 | ~ | 2−0 | 1−1 | 1−1 | 2−0 | 2−0 | 11 | 19 | −8 |
| 12 | Hanoi Phoenix | HNP | 0−2 | 0−2 | 0−2 | 0−2 | 0−2 | 2−0 | 1−1 | 0−2 | 0−2 | 1−1 | 0−2 | ~ | 1−1 | 2−0 | 2−0 | 1−1 | 10 | 20 | −10 |
| 13 | Danang Elements | DNE | 0−2 | 0−2 | 0−2 | 0−2 | 0−2 | 0−2 | 0−2 | 0−2 | 0−2 | 2−0 | 1−1 | 1−1 | ~ | 1−1 | 1−1 | 2−0 | 8 | 22 | −14 |
| 14 | Hanoi Vikings | HNV | 0−2 | 0−2 | 0−2 | 0−2 | 0−2 | 0−2 | 0−2 | 0−2 | 1−1 | 1−1 | 1−1 | 0−2 | 1−1 | ~ | 2−0 | 1−1 | 7 | 23 | −16 |
| 15 | Aces Gaming | ACE | 0−2 | 0−2 | 0−2 | 0−2 | 1−1 | 0−2 | 0−2 | 0−2 | 0−2 | 0−2 | 0−2 | 0−2 | 1−1 | 0−2 | ~ | 2−0 | 4 | 26 | −22 |
| 16 | Saigon Xgame | XG | 0−2 | 0−2 | 0−2 | 0−2 | 0−2 | 0−2 | 1−1 | 0−2 | 0−2 | 0−2 | 0−2 | 1−1 | 0−2 | 1−1 | 0−2 | ~ | 3 | 27 | −24 |

== Final standings ==
₫ 1,510,000,000 Vietnamese Dong are spread among the teams as seen below:

| Place | Prize | Team | Qualification |
|---|---|---|---|
| 1st | ₫250,000,000 | Saigon Fantastic Five | 2015 GPL Summer |
| 2nd | ₫180,000,000 | Saigon Jokers | 2015 GPL Summer |
| 3rd | ₫150,000,000 | Boba Marines | 2015 GPL Summer |
| 4th | ₫128,000,000 | ZOTAC Dung Club | 2015 GPL Summer |
| 5th | ₫110,000,000 | Full Louis | 2015 GPL Summer |
| 6th | ₫96,000,000 | Hanoi Fate | 2015 GPL Summer |
| 7th | ₫86,000,000 | Hanoi Dragons | |
| 8th | ₫76,000,000 | Ultimate | |
| 9th | ₫70,000,000 | 269 Gaming | |
| 10th | ₫64,000,000 | Saigon Dai Binh | |
| 11th | ₫60,000,000 | Hanoi SkyRed | |
| 12th | ₫56,000,000 | Hanoi Phoenix | |
| 13th | ₫52,000,000 | Danang Elements | |
| 14th | ₫48,000,000 | Vikings Gaming | |
| 15th | ₫44,000,000 | Aces Gaming | |
| 16th | ₫40,000,000 | Saigon Xgame | |
