= Strife (2015 video game) =

Multiplayer online battle arena video game

- Developer: S2 Games
- Publisher: S2 Games
- Engine: K2 Engine
- Platforms: Linux, OS X, Windows
- Release: WW: May 22, 2015
- Genre: Multiplayer online battle arena
- Mode: Multiplayer Single Player

Strife is a multiplayer online battle arena (MOBA) video game developed by S2 Games. This is S2 Games' second MOBA game aimed to a more casual player base than Heroes of Newerth, most notably incorporating various gameplay elements that focus on heavily reducing player toxicity and introducing persistent mechanics outside of the arena, including Pets and Crafting. The game uses an engine called Kodiak which is based on the Heroes of Newerth (K2 Engine) with some improvements on lighting and physics.

== Gameplay ==
Strife pits two teams of players against each other, both teams are based at opposite corners of the map in their respective bases. Bases consist of one central structure, creep spawn points, three generators and a hero spawning pool. The goal of the game is to destroy the central structure of the opposite base, called the "Crux". Players achieve this by selecting heroes with unique skills to combat the other team, both teams can select the same heroes. Each game a player chooses one hero to be for the duration of the match. Every hero has four abilities that may be acquired and upgraded as the hero gains experience and levels up. Heroes abilities are often very similar to the ones of the characters of several other MOBA games.

== Development ==
Strife was announced on August 8, 2013 after it had been in development for 2 years.

As of February 22, 2014, Strife went in closed beta.

As of August 29, 2014 Strife went in open beta.

As of April 9, 2015 Strife has been published on Steam as an early access game.

As of May 22, 2015 Strife has been released as a free-to-play on Steam.

As of October 2018, Strife servers were shut down, and S2 Games quietly closed down.

As of September 2024, the game was revived with community support, and servers were brought back online. The community has since maintained regular updates, with new patches and events documented on Steam.

== Reception ==
On Steam, the game holds approximately 76% positive reviews from over 4,700 user ratings as of 2025. While initial critical reception was mixed, later commentary highlighted the game's diminishing player base rather than its gameplay quality. Additionally, SpazioGames called the game "a simplistic MOBA, that cannot really stand out." The game garnered mixed reviews with a metascore of 7 stars. The reviews of Strife that came out after some time of the official release of the game discusses aspects such as the diminishing playerbase of the game. Esportsedition's review puts forward the idea that "There's no hope for Strife to make a comeback—it is, indeed, a very dead game—but that doesn't diminish the actual quality of gameplay" The same review also discusses the relation of release dates of both Strife and Heroes of the Storm, a "casual MOBA" video game developed and published by Blizzard Inc. Overall, after official support of the game diminished, the reception of the game went from a promising MOBA in an environment where other MOBAs such as Dota 2 were highly popular, to a game with "potential but no follow through"

== See also ==
- Savage: The Battle for Newerth
- Savage 2: A Tortured Soul
- Heroes of Newerth
- Heroes of the Storm
