= 2017 Vietnam Championship Series A Spring Season =

League of Legends League

2017 VCS A Spring
- 2017

Tournament information
- Sport: League of Legends
- Dates: 8 February–2 April
- Administrator: Garena Vietnam
- Host: Vietnam
- Teams: 8

Final positions
- Champions: GIGABYTE Marines
- Runner-up: Young Generation

The 2017 Vietnam Championship Series A Spring Season was the first split of the fifth season of Vietnam's fully professional League of Legends league. Eight teams competed in a round robin group stage, with the top four teams continuing to offline playoffs.

== Format ==
- Group Stage

- 7 teams

- 4 teams from Spring Promotion
- 3 teams from 2016 VCS A Summer

- Double Round Robin.
- Each match is best of three. Win = 3 points & Lose = 0 points.
- Show Tiebreaker Rules
- Top 4 teams advance to Playoffs.
- 7th place drop to Summer Promotion.
- Each team has 10 players who can be registered in the team's line-up at the same time.

- Playoffs

- King of the Hill Bracket
- All matches are best of five
- Winner qualifies for the 2017 GPL Spring

== Participants ==
Team(s)	ID
(Vietnam) Cherry Esports	CR
(Vietnam) e.Hub United	EHU
(Vietnam) Hanoi Skyred (Note: For concealing the relationship between team co-owner with a company to provide services that violate the rules and regulations tournament, SkyRed's slot is disallowed from participating in the Championship Series and the team owner is banned from his position and will not be accepted in any official position for any team in a Riot-sanctioned League for the period of 1 year.)	HSR
(Vietnam) Friends Forever Gaming	FFQ
(Vietnam) GIGABYTE Marines	GAM
(Vietnam) Next Gen Esports	NGE
(Vietnam) Young Generation	YG
(Vietnam) Ultimate	UTM

=== Rosters ===
Teams	Players				
Teams	Top	Jungle	Mid	ADC	Support
Cherry Esports	(Vietnam) Mini	(Vietnam) Pake	(Vietnam) Ren (Vietnam) LoveQ	(Vietnam) Celebrity	(Vietnam) RonOP
e.Hub United	(Vietnam) Keiko	(Vietnam) Shin	(Vietnam) Victory	(Vietnam) Zin	(Vietnam) CombatLao
Boba Marines	(Vietnam) Stark	(Vietnam) Levi	(Vietnam) Optimus	(Vietnam) Slay	(Vietnam) Archie
Friends Forever	(Vietnam) KingJ	(Vietnam) Haeven	(Vietnam) Warzone (Vietnam) PotM (Vietnam) QTV	(Vietnam) Minas	(Vietnam) Scary (Vietnam) BaRoiBeo (Vietnam) ChiChi
Next Gen Esports	(Vietnam) Kidz	(Vietnam) Exo	(Vietnam) Petland	(Vietnam) Clear	(Vietnam) Akeno
Ultimate	(Vietnam) Hope	(Vietnam) Tarzan	(Vietnam) Crepp	(Vietnam) Hyojin	(Vietnam) Tear
Young Generation	(Vietnam) NhocTy	(Vietnam) Venus	(Vietnam) Naul	(Vietnam) Bigkoro	(Vietnam) Trung

== Results ==
=== Group stage ===
- 8 February - 19 March
- Round robin format.

#	Team	~	GAM	YG	UTM	EHU	NGE	FFQ	CR	W	L	±
1	GIGABYTE Marines	GAM	~	2−0	2−0	2−0	2−0	2−0	2−0	12	0	+12
2	Young Generation	YG	0−2	~	2−0	2−0	2−0	2−0	2−0	10	2	+8
3	Ultimate	UTM	0−2	0−2	~	1−1	2−0	1−1	2−0	6	6	+0
4	e.Hub United	EHU	0−2	0−2	1−1	~	2−0	1−1	2−0	6	6	+0
5	Next Gen Esports	NGE	0−2	0−2	0−2	0−2	~	2−0	2−0	4	8	−4
6	Friends Forever Gaming	FFQ	0−2	0−2	0−2	0−2	2−0	~	2−0	4	8	−4
7	Cherry Esports	CR	0−2	0−2	0−2	0−2	0−2	0−2	~	0	12	−12

=== Playoffs ===
- 25 March - 2 April
Rosters

Teams	Players				
Teams	Top	Jungle	Mid	ADC	Support
GIGABYTE Marines	(Vietnam) Stark	(Vietnam) Levi	(Vietnam) Optimus	(Vietnam) Slay	(Vietnam) Archie
Ultimate	(Vietnam) Calm (Vietnam) Hope	(Vietnam) Tarzan	(Vietnam) BlazeS (Vietnam) Crepp	(Vietnam) Hyojin	(Vietnam) Tear
Young Generation	(Vietnam) Nevan	(Vietnam) Venus	(Vietnam) Naul	(Vietnam) Bigkoro	(Vietnam) Trungg
e.Hub United	(Vietnam) Keiko	(Vietnam) Shin	(Vietnam) Victory	(Vietnam) Zin	(Vietnam) CombatLao

Results

Game One Cyber Cafe, Ho Chi Minh City

- Round 1

  Ultimate 3−0 e.Hub United

Vikings FPS Stadium, Hanoi

- Round 2

  Young Generation 3−1 Ultimate

Hoa Binh Theatre, Ho Chi Minh City

- Final

  GIGABYTE Marines 3−0 Young Generation

== Final standings ==
₫ 800,000,000 Vietnamese Dong are spread among the teams as seen below:

Place	Prize	Team	Qualification
1st	₫250,000,000	GIGABYTE Marines	2017 GPL Spring
2nd	₫160,000,000	Young Generation	
3rd	₫110,000,000	Ultimate	
4th	₫85,000,000	e.Hub United	
5th	₫75,000,000	Next Gen Esports	
6th	₫65,000,000	Friends Forever	
7th	₫55,000,000	Cherry Esports	Summer Promotion
