= Mole Baby =

2012 video game

- App icon
- Developer(s): Taomee
- Publisher(s): Taomee
- Platform(s): iOS
- Release: February 16, 2012 (US); February 23, 2012 (WW)
- Genre(s): Simulation
- Mode(s): Single-player

Mole Baby is a 2012 simulation game developed and published by the Chinese game studio Taomee. It was released for iOS on February 23, 2012. The game is part of a franchise; other games include Mole Manor, Mole Kart, and Mole's World.

== Gameplay ==
Mole Baby is a simulation game where the primary objective is to play with and raise the mole baby. The baby gives beans, which can be used to buy costumes, fireworks, and decorations.
