= Ring of Elysium =

Free-to-play online game

- Developer: Aurora Studio
- Publishers: Tencent Games; Garena
- Composers: Tom Salta; Thomas Parisch; Shaun Chasin; Edwin Wendler
- Engine: QuickSilverX
- Platform: Microsoft Windows
- Release: June 24, 2019
- Genre: Battle royale
- Mode: Multiplayer

Ring of Elysium (Chinese: 无限法则) was a free-to-play, multiplayer online battle royale game developed by Aurora Studio and published by TCH Scarlet Limited, each a subsidiary of Tencent Games, and is available to download for free on Steam, DMM & Garena. In North America, Europe and parts of Asia it was released on Steam on 19 September 2018 as a free-to-play early access game on the North American servers, and on 25 November 2018 on the European servers. The game servers were permanently shut down on December 1, 2023.

== Plot ==
Ring of Elysium is heavily based on its narrative style and deep lore connecting each and everything happening in the game every season. Each season continues the story and adds 3 new characters into the game with each having their own backstories and connections to the events taking place. In Season 1, players are introduced to the snowy mountains of Mt. Dione as they must fight to death till 4 can escape its disastrous snowstorm Ymir. In Season 2, players are introduced into Europa Island, as once again, they fight for guaranteed survival as they attempt to escape from a volcanic eruption and the ash that descends across the map.

=== Season 1: Arctic Survival ===
The story begins with the introduction of three characters from the Elysium universe being Lynn, Hikage and Gavin. In the classic match, 60 people are trapped in a snow mountain-based map "Mt. Dione", assaulted by a disastrous snowstorm Ymir. The way out is a rescue flight which can only save up to four people. Survivors must stay ahead of the approaching storm while eliminating competitors. Players are equipped with a snowboard, climbing gear, or a hang glider, to traverse the snowy terrain and adapt to fights and other intense situations.

=== Season 2: Paradise Falls ===
The story continues with three new characters in Season 2 - Bradley, Sylvia, and Alfonso. 60 people are trapped on a tropical island and the players must escape a cloud of volcanic ash engulfing the area Europa Island. A rescue helicopter will arrive in the final safe zone to rescue four players; time is critical, as the pyroclastic flow eruption is imminent. The classic matches on Europa Island start with a choice of three Traversal modes, the Hang Glider, BMX Bike, and Grappling Hook, the players have to use the 3 choices and survive the volcanic ash as well as fight other players for surviving while keeping an eye on the toxic gases and ash from the volcano. As the match progresses and failing to stay away from the ash storm leads to a painful and swift death from the toxic gases.

=== Season 3: Storm The Europa ===
The story continues and another three characters enter the Elysium Universe - Captain Fokke, Elliot and Saki. The core gameplay remains the same, with the addition of a pirate ship making things interesting. During every round, after the dynamic weather system of ROE[Ring Of Elysium] went into "Typhoon" mode, a cursed pirate ship appears on the map. While the ship is moving, loot boxes (pirate barrels) are being continuously thrown off the ship as an extra source of high tier loot or new tactical items like a DPV. Later in the season underwater treasure hunting and exploring the secret ruins of an ancient civilization found deep under the waters around Europa Island were added to the gameplay.

== Development ==
Ring of Elysium is a re-development of an earlier game called Europa. The game is developed with Tencent Games's QuickSilverX engine.

The game underwent a closed beta test phase on Garena Launcher which was set to end at 10 July 2018 for its Thailand server, and 4 June 2018 for its Indonesian server.

The game was released to Steam for early access in North America on 19 September 2018, proceeding with 20 September 2018 for Asia, and 25 September 2018 for Europe.

== Legal Issues ==
In January 2019, a model named Mei Yan posted to her Twitter account about the game using her likeness without permission, along with images showing the similarities between promotional images for the character and a 2015 post on Yan's Instagram. The character was removed soon after, though possibly only due to the ending of Season 1.

== Cancellation ==
On September 1, 2023, it was announced ROE would be closed permanently as of December 1, 2023. The reason for cancellation was not given in the notice. There has been a consistent drop in player count from an initial 52 thousand peak players at launch but with more recent figures showing around 350 average players per day.
