= Forrest Li =

Singaporean billionaire (born c. 1977)

Forrest Li Xiaodong
- 李小冬
- Born: 1977 or 1978 (age 48–49); Tianjin, China
- Citizenship: Singaporean
- Education: Shanghai Jiaotong University (BA); Stanford University (MBA)
- Known for: Founder of Sea Limited; Chairman of Lion City Sailors FC; President of the Football Association of Singapore

Forrest Li Xiaodong (born 1977 or 1978) is a Chinese-born Singaporean entrepreneur and billionaire. He is the founder, chairman and chief executive officer of Sea Limited, a Singapore tech company with subsidiaries including Garena, Shopee, and Monee. In addition, he is the chairman of Lion City Sailors FC, as well as president of the Football Association of Singapore (FAS).He also serves on the Board of Trustees of the National University of Singapore, and is a member of the Executive Committee of the Singapore National Olympic Council (SNOC).

Li is married and lives in Singapore. He appeared on the August 2020 cover of Forbes Asia, the Asia edition of Forbes magazine. As of April 5, 2024, his net worth was estimated at US$3.6 billion according to the Forbes World’s Billionaires List, ranking him as the ninth richest person in Singapore.

== Early life ==
Forrest Li Xiaodong was born in Tianjin, China. He earned a bachelor's degree in engineering from Shanghai Jiaotong University, and after graduation worked at Motorola Solutions and Corning. He then earned an MBA from Stanford Graduate School of Business, where he watched Steve Jobs give his "stay hungry, stay foolish" commencement speech. Li later credited the speech as inspiring him to become a startup founder.

After graduation, Li moved to Singapore with limited financial resources and $100,000 in student loan debt. He and his wife, whom he met at Stanford, rented a single bedroom in a three-room public housing unit in Braddell. He became a Singapore citizen and founded his company Sea in Singapore.

== Career ==
Li founded Sea in 2009, initially as a digital entertainment company under the name Garena. At the time, the company operated out of a single shophouse off Maxwell Road at Tanjong Pagar. The company first focused on game publishing. Over the years, Li's company diversified its business to include e-commerce and digital financial services. In 2015, Garena launched Shopee, an e-commerce platform that grew to become one of the leading online shopping service providers in Southeast Asia. Later, the company introduced Monee (formerly SeaMoney), which offers digital financial services including payments and lending.

In May 2017, after raising US$550 million in a funding round, Garena underwent a corporate rebranding and adopted the name Sea Ltd, while retaining use of the name Garena for Sea's digital entertainment segment.

In March 2019, after the share price of his consumer internet company Sea Ltd increased by 45%, Li's net worth increased to more than $1 billion.

== Football involvement ==
Li is a football enthusiast and serves as the chairman of the Lion City Sailors, a Singapore Premier League football club acquired by Sea in 2020. This was the first privatization of a Singapore Premier League club (formerly called Home United). The club was acquired for an undisclosed sum, and Li said that his aim was to elevate the local football scene and create a world-class training environment for youths in Singapore.

In 2022, the Lion City Sailors FC opened a 28,000 square meter, S$10 million training facility in Singapore, as part of Li's commitment to Singapore football.

In 2025, Li was elected unopposed as the president of the Football Association of Singapore (FAS). Li stated his priority will be to expand youth-development pathways for local players and bring "pride and joy" back to Singapore football.
