= Savage 2: A Tortured Soul =

2008 video game

- Developer: S2 Games
- Publisher: S2 Games
- Writer: Mark R. Yohalem
- Series: Savage
- Engine: K2 Engine
- Platforms: Linux, Microsoft Windows, Mac OS X
- Release: Microsoft Windows; January 16, 2008^{Steam} May 7, 2008; GNU/Linux; March 24, 2008
- Genres: First-person shooter Real-time strategy Action role-playing game
- Mode: Multiplayer

Savage 2: A Tortured Soul is a fantasy and science fiction themed video game that combines elements of the first-person shooter, real-time strategy, and action role-playing game genres. It is developed and published by S2 Games. It is the sequel to Savage: The Battle for Newerth and was officially released on January 16, 2008. By December 2008 the game was officially freeware, with a paid "Premium Account" option that expanded certain aspects of the game.

The game was released through Steam on July 13, 2008 and went free-to-play in December. It was released on Desura in January 2012.

== Gameplay ==
Savage 2: A Tortured Soul is an online player-versus-player game, combining real-time strategy (RTS), first-person shooter (FPS), and action role-playing game (RPG) aspects into its gameplay. It features two opposing factions, the Legion of Man and the Beast Horde, fighting against each other on a large playing field in an attempt to eventually destroy the durable command center of the enemy team, thereby winning the game. The game is played in rounds, and no benefits carry over from each match, despite the RPG elements present in each match.

Most of the players on each team are "action players", battling the other team's action players on the field using powerful third-person melee, weaker first-person ranged attacks, and various attacking, buffing, and debuffing special abilities. Action players have a health gauge, mana gauge for use with special abilities and certain units' ranged attacks, and stamina gauge for attacking, jumping, and sprinting. They have a red "Charge" meter, which can be consumed for a quick burst of forward speed compared to normal sprinting, as well as for dodging sideways and backwards. They can also put up a guard that nullifies melee damage from the front; unlike the previous game, both humans and beasts have access to blocking. When the game initially released, this was unlimited and could only be beaten by a dedicated, slower but stronger "Interrupt" attack, stunning the defender. After an update, Interrupt attacks were removed in favor of a white, limited "Block" meter, leaving the defender stunned if depleted.

Action players can choose from a selection of units to play as in the loadout menu, providing a variety of different playstyles and roles. For each team, these include three starting units: a builder unit that can accelerate a building's construction as well as repair it, and two light combat units. Unlocked through technology buildings are a stronger heavy combat unit, a healer/support unit, and two siege units that excel at damaging enemy buildings. Players may earn Gold from their actions on the field which may be either donated to the "Team Gold" pool, spent on useful items in an RPG fashion, or used to buy access to heavy combat and siege units.

On each team, there is one Commander player, who sees the game from a top-down RTS perspective. The Commander can issue orders to the action players, draw on the mini-map, cast spells on both teams' action players, and build structures for the team. The Commander player may choose to step down and become an action player or they can be impeached via team vote. If a team has no Commander, the team's builder units unlock the ability to build instead until another player fills the role. Different structures act as spawn points, Gold mines, technology buildings which unlock more units, abilities, and items for the action players, or defensive towers that automatically attack enemies in range or support nearby structures. Buildings require Team Gold to be built and repaired, which can either be extracted from Gold nodes across the map by constructing Gold mines on them, or donated by the action players. Normal buildings may be attacked and destroyed by action players, though the loss of these is normally only a setback whereas the destruction of the command center results in the loss of the match.

Aside from the Commander and normal action players, there are "officers", action players who are the leaders of "squads" of other action players. A team may have several squads depending on the number of players in the match. Squad officers have improved statistics, and also offer some of those bonuses to any squadmates within a certain range. The squad officer may also issue orders to their squad, much like the Commander can to the whole team. Finally, squad officers are uniquely able to place small, fragile, and time-limited portals that can only be used by the squad as a temporary forward spawn.

Tying into Gold, the game also features an "Upkeep" system. At timed intervals, Gold extracted from captured Gold mines is added to the Team Gold pool for use in building and structure repairs. Upkeep is met if a team has at least one Gold mine whose Gold isn't yet depleted. After the 8-minute mark, if a team has no captured and working Gold mine when the Upkeep interval resets then they are put into an "Upkeep Not Met" state. Beyond the lack of steady Team Gold income, a team's buildings are also susceptible to greater damage and are not protected by support structures until another Gold mine is procured and the state is lifted. If both teams have not met Upkeep for a set amount of intervals, usually due to all Gold nodes on a map being depleted, the match then enters a "Sudden Death" state where all buildings take considerably increased damage and repairing is disabled.

In addition to the Beast and Human units, there exist a third special set of powerful units called the Hellbourne, available to both teams. These units are significantly more powerful than other playable units and difficult to gain access to. Action players gain Souls by killing enemy units, and a certain amount of Souls may be spent at a "Hellshrine" (alternatively referred to in-game as a Sacrificial Shrine) for one lifetime of the selected Hellbourne unit. Hellshrines must first be built; they are expensive and may only be placed on top of "Scars" which are located at specific set points on the map, making them a risky structure to construct and maintain. Hellbourne units are common gamebreakers later on in a match, where action players may have accumulated a plethora of Souls.

== Modding ==
A map editor is available, which allows for scripts, events and all sorts of things so players can create their own game types, similar to Warcraft III. Mods from Capture the Flag to Soccer have been created.

== Community Edition ==
Savage 2: A Tortured Soul Community Edition is an updated client for Savage 2 made by the community team. It upgrades the game from 32-bit architecture to 64-bit, fixes several bugs and crashes that have been present since the original game, and features both adjusted existing content and new content, mainly item and unit rebalances. It was announced on the Savage 2 Discord server and released on November 12, 2025.

== Reception ==
Reception

Aggregate scores
Aggregator	Score
GameRankings	77%
Metacritic	75/100

Review scores
Publication	Score
GamesRadar+	3/5
IGN	8.3/10

== See also ==
- Savage: The Battle for Newerth
- Heroes of Newerth
- Strife
