= Aceforce 2 =

2024 mobile tactical shooter video game

Ace Force 2
- Developer: MoreFun Studios
- Publisher: Tencent Games
- Engine: Unreal Engine 4
- Platforms: Android, iOS
- Release: July 5, 2024 (Early Access); July 6, 2024
- Genres: Tactical shooter, first-person shooter
- Mode: Multiplayer

Ace Force 2 is a free-to-play team-based tactical shooter video game developed by MoreFun Studios, a subsidiary of Tencent Games. It is a sequel to the mobile game Ace Force. The game utilizes Unreal Engine 4 and features 5v5 multiplayer combat.

== Gameplay ==
Ace Force 2 is a first-person shooter that focuses on 5v5 player versus player (PvP) matches. Players select from a roster of virtual characters, each equipped with distinct skills and abilities. The gameplay mechanics emphasize tactical positioning and teamwork. Combat features include precise shooting mechanics and a "one-shot kill" system. The game includes original map designs and character animations. It utilizes a free-to-play model with in-app purchases.

== Development and release ==
The game is developed by MoreFun Studios, a division of the Chinese technology company Tencent. In January 2024, it was reported that Tencent had filed trademark applications for Ace Force 2 in Europe and Canada. The filing suggested a potential release outside of the Chinese market.

The game was released in early access for Android devices in selected regions on July 5, 2024. It was officially launched for download on Google Play and the game's website on July 6, 2024. Upon its initial launch, the game was available to users in specific territories, including Europe and Canada. An iOS version is planned for a later date.
