= Mole Kart =

2012 video game

- App icon
- Developer: Shanghai Shengran Information Technology
- Publisher: Shanghai Shengran Information Technology
- Platforms: iOS, Android
- Release: Jan 12, 2012
- Genre: Racing
- Modes: Single-player, multiplayer

Mole Kart is a Chinese racing video game developed by Shanghai Shengran Information Technology for iOS and Android. The original Mole Kart game was released for the iOS back in January 2012; but due to a claim by Nintendo for ripping off Mario Kart, Apple removed it from the App Store. A new version titled Mole Kart I was re-released on May 4 the same year. The new version of the game is now also available for Android devices.

== Gameplay ==
Players may choose as one of eight characters from the Mole Man franchise. There is Speed Mode, which has no items, Item Mode, which has items which influences the race, and also Multiplayer Mode. The karts accelerate automatically and are controlled by tilting the device. Onscreen controls are available in the games settings menu.

== Reception ==
The extreme similarity to the Mario Kart series was noted by Slide to Play, Joystiq, G4TV, TouchArcade, and also Destructoid.

The game has received positive reviews from iTunes and Google Play Store users, but it received mostly negative reviews from critics. Phil Eaves from Slide to Play said that "the developers have gone too far in the realm of mimicry." Lisa Caplan of 148apps gave it 2.5 out of 5 stars, calling the game a "blatant knock-off of Mario Kart". A reviewer from iPhoneGamerUK gave it a 3/5, while criticizing the game for being a Mario Kart rip-off, but positively noted that the game was "the next best thing".

== Legacy ==
A sequel, titled Mole Kart 2: Evolution, was released on 28 September 2012. 148apps gave the game a positive review, saying that "The brand has finally grown into something worthwhile", as opposed to the original which was a copy of Mario Kart.

== See also ==
- Mole's World
- Mole Baby
- Mole Manor
