= Mole Manor =

2008 Flash-based video game

- Developer: Taomee
- Platform: Adobe Flash
- Release: 28 April 2008; 18 years ago
- Genre: Massively multiplayer online game
- Mode: Multiplayer

Mole Manor (Chinese: 摩尔庄园) is a massive multiplayer online game targeted at children ages 6 to 14; there is, however, no specific age or gender restriction on the game. The game was inspired by the online platform Club Penguin, where players can choose cartoon mole-avatars, decorate their virtual homes, adopt pets, and socialize with other players. They can wander through the virtual streets, chat with other users, go shopping, work, and play mini-games.

Mole Manor occasionally offers promotional games that are available for a limited period. The official version was tested in March 2008 and was made available to the public on 28 April 2008, with regular, scheduled maintenance every Friday, except holidays. The mainland version was terminated in March 2015. However, the launch of an official Weibo version of the game was announced on 18 January 2019. Mole Manor is driven by Adobe Flash Player, and offers paid services.

== Plot ==
Moles and Ramus live in the Black Forest. Moles are friendly, diligent and are excellent architects. Ramus, the goblins of banyan trees, are good friends of the moles and they live happily together in the forest. The king of the moles led his followers to create Mole Manor in the middle of the Black Forest. The manor is similar to those that existed in Medieval Europe. At that time, the Black Forest was beautiful and the center of cultural communications. During the reign of King Mole III, the Black Forest was burnt down. The underground homes of moles and the banyan trees where the Ramus lived were both destroyed. The manor was then reconstructed in the southern region of the Black Forest. The ruler of the kingdom is Princess Meme, who is the last heir of the royal family and lives in Mole Castle, protecting the Manor with her knights. Gradually, shopping malls, schools, news agencies, banks, and entertainment parks are developed by the hard-working moles.

== Gameplay ==
Mole Manor has multiple functions, including a virtual community, dress and fashion, interactive games, pet raising and virtual home decoration. Players will be in Role-playing as moles. The color of mole can be tailored. Players have a patch of garden where they can farm and a house that is ready to be decorated. Players can socialize with other players on the virtual streets or in their virtual homes. They can either chat, pay a visit, provide help or send gifts to friends. Moles can also attend school.

There are also mini-games like water fights, hide-and-seek, theatre playing and idiom guessing. They can also have Ramus, a kind of plant goblin, as pets. Players must feed, clean and take care of the Ramus, and sometimes send them to school. Ramus that are not cared for may die from neglect. Players can pay a small fee to upgrade their Ramus into Super Ramus, so they will be entitled to a wide range of privileges in the game.

Moles can have career options such as tour guide, policeman, or journalist. Players can accomplish daily assignments. After finishing an assignment, a player will receive rewards, including experience points and the virtual currency "MoDo" (Mole Dollar). MoDo can be used for purchasing clothes, home decorations and Ramus' food. The resources you own depends on the amount of effort you have put into the game. Deals between players are forbidden. Special holidays, theme parties, and featured adventures are available periodically.

The background music is typically works composed by Beethoven, but holiday songs also appear during the holidays. Unlike most online games, Mole Manor does not require users to complete a profile during registration, avoiding potential privacy issues. Players must provide their birthday and email address. The game uses an information filter that forbids players to input numbers in case of an information leak. According to a paper from Shih Hsin University, however, players can divide a sentence into segments to avoid censorship. Players can report others using vulgar language, probing for personal information, or using third-party software. As soon as the report is received, the reported account will be banned from playing again. There are measures to prevent children obsessively playing online games; the website automatically closes at midnight and reopens at 06:00.

== Development ==
Taomee believed that there was a huge market for children's online games. Wang Haibing, former executive of QQ pet project at Tencent, started Taomee and gained investment from Zeng Liqing, the co-founder of Tencent and Wang Bing, and deputy president of Sina.

Before Mole Manor was developed, Taomee aimed to create a children's educational online community named "fruit kids", whose target audience was children between 3 and 8. At that time, however, pre-school children were not extensively exposed to the Internet and the company was more familiar with the Internet than with educational products, and "fruit kids" was abandoned.

Wang Haibing noticed the success of American online game Club Penguin and decided to use a similar pattern, and adjusted the target audience to children aged over 8. Zheng Zhouli, one of the earliest designers of Mole Manor, said the game was targeted at primary school students who had heavy academic burdens and needed a relaxing game. When the game was released, the target audience was children aged between 8 and 14. During its trial stage, the target-player age-range was adjusted to 7 to 12, and finally it became 7 to 14.

Taomee often improved its product using users' feedback. For example, there was no bank in the game before some players said they had earned too much MoDo and had no idea how to spend them. After a bank was introduced to the game, many young players asked their parents, "why I saved money in the bank and the amount begin to increase? Aren't the banks going to be become bankrupt for giving back too much money?" The developer also taught young players about basic financial knowledge.

== Operations ==
Regions	Developer/ Agent	Translation	Start date	Terminate date	Domestic ranking	Global ranking	Official website
Mainland China	Shanghai TaoMee		2008.04.28		18,482	102,096	mole.61.com
Hong Kong, Macau, and Taiwan	Taiwan TaoMee	摩爾莊園	2008.12.24		3,877	234,970	mole.61.com.tw
Vietnam	VNG	Vương Quốc Chuột Chũi	2011.10	2012.12.28	9	748	moly.zing.vn
Japan	So-net	もぐもぐランド	2012.06	2013.09.30		1,836,996 (final data)	www.mole55.jp
Thailand	SNS+	MOLOO	2012.06	2013.04		2,387,275 (final data)	www.moloo.in.th
South Korea	Joyian	데굴데굴 두두월드	2012.07	2013.03.28		2,242,917 (final data)	dd.joyian.com
Europe	Pending						
United States	Pending						

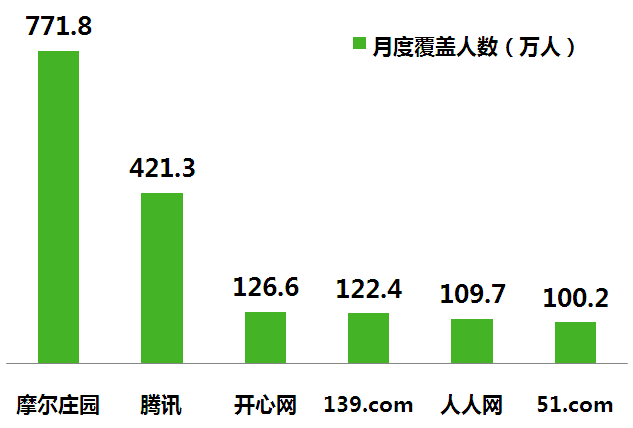
December, 2009, figures of users of different children virtual community websites.

=== Mainland China ===
Mole Manor is the first children's online game in mainland China, and occupied the biggest market share. There had been rumors that the game was about to be terminated bur Taomee later clarified the situation. In 2009, Taomee said Mole Manor had 30,000,000 players, including 10,000,000 active accounts. In June 2009, Qiming invested another US$5,000,000 to the game. In August 2009, Mole Manor's monthly income was nearly ten million RMB. By the end of March 2010, there were over 50,000,000 users and more than 30,000,000 active accounts. The mainland China version of Mole Manor stopped operations on November 28, 2014.

=== Taiwan ===
The Taiwanese version of Mole Manor was operated initially by Yixiang Digital Entertainment Inc. The launch of the game was promoted via a major game website "Gamedom" and gained popularity. Many other websites took the same pattern and Mole Manor became even more popular in Taiwan.

The Taiwanese version of Mole Manor has a larger target audience than that of the mainland version. All age groups play the game but the majority of players are under 20 years old. According to the statistics provided by Taomee, most of the players are between 3 and 1 years old and the ratio of male-to-female players is 4:6. According to ARO, Mole Manor surpassed more than 500 websites, and ranked fourth in terms of 'single visit time' and eighth in terms of 'average visit time' in 2009. On January 29, 2010, Taiwan Taomee replaced Yixiang Digital Entertainment Inc and became the operator.

== Reception ==
Mole Manor is very popular among children. According to a paper from Shih Hsin University, they also like sharing experiences with peers. The shared game experience forms communities in real life. Some players are attracted by the exotic setting and delicate images of the game. Some players describe it as a game where is safe, harmonious and healthy.

Players also draw pleasure from earning rewards in the game. Experience point, MoDo and other possession can bring sense of satisfaction to players. Some players register several account to get higher experience points. and share the resources between accounts. The reward system makes players want to achieve higher goals.

The process of solving problems is also enjoyable for players. Some believe that passing a challenging game is rewarding and they like the moment when their efforts have been justified, giving them a sense of fulfillment. Some players prefer to solve the difficulties on their own rather than seeking help from other players or game strategies.

Players also enjoy the life simulation element; according to a survey conducted by Shih Hsin University, although players live the life of moles, most surveyed players show greater interest in Ramus, becoming attached to the Ramus they have been taking care of. The privileges in the game, and the vendor's promotions and publicity, and recommendations from other players are also attractive.

Teenager and Children Research from Young Pioneers of China argues that Mole Manor receives positive feedback because it meets children's needs of socializing, learning and relaxing. Duowan, a game media website, believes this game is like "a wonderland not only for children but also for those adults who still looking for simplicity and carefreeness". Airui net believes Mole Manor fills the gap of Chinese children virtual social community and wins recognition from society and parents for its anti-indulgence measures. Qiming innovation and investment organization said they are very satisfied with their investment, and see it as the most successful investment.

China Central Television criticized Mole Manor for encouraging children to spend their money on virtual commodities. Shanghai Taomee charges the membership of 'super Ramu' 10 RMB per month, but on some shopping website, the fee is only 2-3 RMB. Beijing Evening News criticized the operator for earning money from children.

== Mole's World ==
Mole's World is the iOS (iPhone and iPad) version of the game. This game is a derivative version of the PC version of Mole Manor/ As of 2016 it was one of the most popular games in Asia, with over 100 million registered users. Related games in the same franchise are Mole Kart and Mole Baby.

=== Gameplay ===
The gameplay is extremely similar to Smurfs' Village. Players plant and then collect crops after a certain period of time. To manage the crops, moles are needed to till the fields. A new mole is added each time a new house is built in the village; one mole is needed to complete each task, for example, building the aforementioned houses. However, completing the tasks takes time (up to one day), and thus the players may choose to instantly complete a task by spending a virtual currency known as "Supershells". There are also mini-games to be played in the characters' homes, for example, a fruit-slicing game that is very similar to Fruit Ninja.

=== Reception ===
Reviews noted its similarity with Smurfs Village. MonsterFreeApps said "It's one of the best free iPhone apps that I’ve come across in a while."
