= BlackShot =

2007 multiplayer first-person shooter video game

- Developer: Vertigo Games
- Publishers: WW: Papaya Play; KR: Ntreev Soft; SEA: PlayOne Asia; JP: C&C Media Co., Ltd; EU: TwoWar
- Engine: Gamebryo
- Platform: Microsoft Windows
- Release: KOR: 15 November 2007; 18 years ago; SEA: 30 April 2009; 16 years ago; Europe: 12 May 2010; 15 years ago
- Genre: First-person shooter
- Modes: Single-player, multiplayer

BlackShot (Korean: 블랙샷) is a multiplayer first-person shooter game developed by Vertigo Games. It was released in Korea for Microsoft Windows on 15 November 2007. There were initially several different versions of the game for different regions of the world, but it is currently published by Vertigo's subsidiary Papaya Play for the global service.

== Plot ==
The story is set in the aftermath of a nuclear apocalypse, triggered by the threat of expanding armies of cloned soldiers. From the ashes arose military factions and corporations, who now race to rebuild the human clone soldier technology.

The factions include Gaia Inc., The Cloners, and Blackshot mercenaries. Gaia are an energy conglomerate that have a large influence over the new world governments. They seek to recover old world technology, and research new forms of energy production. Its nuclear reactor facilities and research laboratories are often the sites for skirmishes. The Cloners are a corporation that owns all of the surviving cloning factories, but dependent on Gaia for energy. The Cloners aggressively pursue cloning technology, and often employ mercenaries to defend what remaining cloning installations it possesses. Blackshot is one of the game world's leading mercenary groups, and agents are expected to fulfil the terms of their contract to the letter.

== Gameplay ==
The first release of BlackShot included two main game modes: Team Flag Match and Explosion Mission (now titled as Search and Destroy). Team Flag Match is a capture the flag variant where each team is in charge of protecting their flag runners on smaller maps with infinite respawns. Successfully raising the flag at its destination brings the team five points in addition to one point for each team kill. Mission consists of battle rounds between the attacking team with the goal of installing the bomb and the defending team trying to prevent the installation. In 2011, Team Death Match has been added to the game, where the first team that reaches a set number of kills wins.

Every successful kill or action gives the players two things: experience points and BlackPoints (BP). The first ones are used for progression through the several ranks, and the second ones represent the virtual currency, which allows for buying items like weapons or armor. BlackShot supports various gameplay modes such as Practice and Search & Destroy Infinite, and a customization mode that limits which equipment the players can use.

One of the features is the Partner System, in which the players form a one-to-one relationship to fight together. The partners can share ammo and field of view between each other, with an exclusive use of Partner View. In Partner View, a small image from the partner's perspective is presented during the match. It acts like a radar added to the map display, informing of the enemy's positions by marking them. When one of the partners dies, the other gets to receive the current location of the opponent who made the kill, and earn points as a reward if the player makes an act of revenge on that player. If the partners are killed around the same time and one of them has a shorter respawn, that time will be applied to both, with the two appearing simultaneously.

== Reception ==
BlackShot drew over 1 million players in Singapore, with concurrent players topping 20,000 in July 2011.
