= GKART =

2010 video game

- Developer: TiMi Studio Group
- Publishers: Tencent Games; Garena; VNG Games
- Engine: PhysX
- Platforms: Microsoft Windows; Android; iOS; HarmonyOS
- Release: Microsoft Windows: WW: October 1, 2010; Android, iOS, HarmonyOS: CHN: December 29, 2017; WW: January 16, 2019; VIE: December 18, 2018; CHN: December 26, 2024
- Genre: Racing
- Mode: Multiplayer

GKART, also known as QQ Speed, Speed Drifters, or Zing Speed (due to having been released by VNG Group), is a massively multiplayer online kart racing game developed by TiMi Studio Group and published by Tencent Games and Garena. The game was originally released in China as QQ Speed in 2010 and gained enormous popularity in China, with a record number of 2 million players online at the same time in 2011. The game was heavily inspired by Nintendo's Mario Kart franchise.

Garena introduced GKART to 13 countries including Singapore, Malaysia, Australia and the United States in 2011. GKART was selected into the World Cyber Games (WCG) at Singapore and China the same year. The game was shut down on 31 March 2012, before it was later re-released. The mobile game version was launched on 29 December 2017 as QQ Speed: Mobile in China, on 16 January 2019 as Garena Speed Drifters for markets outside mainland China, and on 18 December 2018 as Zing Speed in Vietnam.

As of January 2020, QQ Speed has 700 million players worldwide, including 200 million mobile players. The mobile version grossed $799 million during 2017–2018.

== Gameplay ==
Screenshot of the mobile version of the game
