= Garena =

Singaporean digital entertainment platform

- Trade name: Garena; Sea Ltd
- Type: Public
- Traded as: NYSE: SE
- ISIN: US81141R1005
- Industry: Video Games
- Founded: 8 May 2009; 17 years ago
- Founder: Forrest Li
- Headquarters: Singapore
- Key people: Forrest Li (Founder); Terry Zhao (President)
- Revenue: ▲$2.9 billion (2026)
- Owner: Sea Ltd
- Website: www.garena.sg

Garena is a Singaporean game developer and publisher of free online games. It is the digital entertainment arm of parent company Sea Ltd, which formerly used Garena as the parent company name.

The company distributes game titles on Garena+ in various countries across Southeast Asia and Taiwan, including the multiplayer online battle arena (MOBA) games League of Legends and Heroes of Newerth, the first-person shooter game Point Blank, the mobile MOBA game Arena of Valor and the mobile racing game Speed Drifters. Garena also used to distribute the football simulation game EA Sports FC Online (and EA Sports FC Mobile in Vietnam), until Garena and EA Sports decided to retire the game.

== History ==
=== 2009 to 2015 ===
Garena was established by Forrest Li in Singapore in 2009.

In 2010, Riot Games awarded the publishing rights of League of Legends (LoL) to Garena, for the game’s first launch in Southeast Asia.

In November 2011, Garena announced its publishing rights for the team-based shooter game, Firefall, in Southeast Asia and Taiwan.

In December 2011, Garena announced their collaboration with online games developer, Changyou, to publish and operate the popular 3D martial arts game, Duke of Mount Deer, in Taiwan. The game was the first MMORPG game available through Garena+. The game combines a classic Chinese story with the latest 3D rendering technology and cinematic quality graphics. Duke of Mount Deer was created by several top online-gaming experts from China and South Korea and has gained much popularity in China. The same month, the "Dominion" game mode for Garena's League of Legends players in Singapore and Malaysia was launched.

=== Transition ===
Upon its establishment in 2009, the entire company operated under the name Garena. In March 2015, the Ontario Teachers' Pension Plan (OTPP), one of the largest pension funds in the world, invested in the company, valuing it at over US$2.5 billion.

In May 2017, a corporate rebranding took place, and the parent company adopted the name Sea Ltd. after raising US$550 million in a funding round . However, the digital entertainment segment retained the Garena name, maintaining its brand identity in the gaming industry.

=== 2017 - present ===
In 2017, Garena launched its first self-developed mobile game, Free Fire. Since its release, Free Fire has gained a substantial user base in Southeast Asia and Latin America and expanded its reach, being available in more than 130 countries. As of February 2024, Free Fire has over 100 million daily active users worldwide. According to data.ai, it was the most downloaded mobile game worldwide from 2019 to 2021 and continued to lead as the most-downloaded mobile battle royale game in 2022 and 2023. Besides Southeast Asia and Taiwan, Free Fire is also available in markets such as Europe, North America, Latin America, Brazil, and the Middle East and Africa.

Free Fire's popularity extends into the esports arena. The Free Fire World Series 2021 Singapore (FFWS 2021 SG), held in May 2021, achieved a record of 5.4 million concurrent viewers, excluding Chinese platforms. This marked the highest peak viewership for any esports match in history, as reported by Esports Charts.

In January 2021, Garena acquired Vancouver-based Phoenix Labs, the developers of Dauntless. The acquisition aimed to expand Garena's international presence and enhance its capabilities in game development globally. Operations at Phoenix Labs and the development of Dauntless continued without disruption following the acquisition. By 2023, Phoenix Labs had transitioned back to operating as an independent studio following a management buyout supported by investors.

By the second quarter of 2021, Garena reported having 725 million active users, 45% more than the year prior, while the number of paid users grew 85% year-on-year, reaching 92 million. However, the outlook for Garena appeared less optimistic in 2022. Reports from March indicated that Garena was projected to achieve US$2.9 billion to US$3.1 billion in bookings for the year, a decrease from US$4.6 billion in 2021. This forecasted decline would mark the first ever downturn in Garena's business. One contributing factor to this decline was the ban on its "Free Fire" title in India, affecting its availability on both Google Play and Apple app stores.

In September 2021, Garena announced the global launch of Free Fire Max, an enhanced version of its flagship game, Free Fire. Designed as a standalone application, Free Fire Max retains the core gameplay of Free Fire but incorporates several upgrades, including enhanced graphics and an in-app customizable map for increased player immersion. It also features a more realistic map and exclusive content not available in the original version. The connectivity between Free Fire and Free Fire Max is facilitated by Garena’s proprietary technology, Firelink, which ensures full interoperability between both game versions.

By 2023, Sea reported it had stabilized the Garena's business performance and maintained steady demand for Free Fire, which achieved a peak of over 100 million daily active users in February 2024.

In 2023, Garena announced plans to publish Undawn, an open-world zombie survival game, across Southeast Asia. The company also began releasing another mobile game, Black Clover Mobile, based on the popular manga series Black Clover.

== Products ==
In 2010, Garena launched its first product, Garena+, an online game and social platform for people to meet, chat and play games with one another. Other online products of the company include BeeTalk and TalkTalk.

== Events and tournaments ==
In May 2012, Garena launched the Garena Premier League (GPL), a six-month-long online professional gaming league with more than 100 matches to be played. The first season of GPL is a League of Legends competition which comprises six professional teams. The teams are Bangkok Titans (Thailand), Kuala Lumpur Hunters (Malaysia), Manila Eagles (Philippines), Saigon Jokers (Vietnam), Taipei Assassins (Taiwan) and Singapore Sentinels (Singapore), which represent top players from respective countries. GPL matches are captured and broadcast online along with commentaries, which are available for viewers to watch on the GPL official website.

In January 2013, Garena announced the second season of the Garena Premier League, which would start on 4 January 2013. Garena Premier League 2013 includes two new teams from Taiwan and Vietnam, bringing the total number of teams to eight. The teams are: AHQ, Saigon Fantastic Five, Bangkok Titans, Kuala Lumpur Hunters, Manila Eagles, Saigon Jokers, Taipei Assassins and Singapore Sentinels.

In November 2014, the Garena e-Sports Stadium, a dedicated venue for esports, opened in Neihu District, Taipei. The studio was built partially to accommodate the beginning of the League of Legends Masters Series, the top-level Taiwan, Hong Kong, and Macau LoL league that was spin-off of the GPL. The Garena e-Sports Stadium officially closed in 2019, and future Garena events will be held at the Logitech G Esports Arena in Taipei.

In January 2015, Garena launched Iron Solari League, a women's League of Legends tournament in the Philippines. It is a monthly event organized in the second half of each month. It aims to encourage participation by under-represented groups and is open to all those who self-identify as female.

Besides competitive tournaments, Garena also organizes events to cater to users to meet and connect offline. This includes the annual Garena Carnival held in Singapore and Malaysia.

In 2019, Garena held its largest esports event for Free Fire, the Free Fire World Series in Rio de Janeiro, which drew a peak of more than 2 million concurrent viewers. The following year, Garena's tournament, the Free Fire Continental Series (FFCS), was conducted across three regions: the Americas, Asia, and EMEA (Europe, Middle East, and Africa). The Asia Series broke records with over 2.5 million peak concurrent viewers, according to Esports Charts.

In 2021, the Free Fire World Series finals in Singapore achieved a new milestone for mobile esports by attracting over 5.4 million peak concurrent online viewers, the highest recorded for any mobile esports event.

In December 2023, Garena announced plans to consolidate all local Free Fire leagues under the FFWS (Free Fire World Series) brand starting in 2024. This initiative aims to standardize the game's esports framework and enhance its global identity. Additionally, Garena entered into a partnership with the Esports World Cup (EWC) Foundation, leading to Free Fire's inclusion as a competition title at the inaugural EWC, scheduled to occur in Riyadh, Saudi Arabia, in July 2024.

== Controversy ==
On February 3, 2015, Garena eSports announced restrictions on the participation of gay and transgender individuals in an all-female League of Legends tournament, citing concerns about an "unfair advantage." This decision was met with criticism from the gaming community and a statement from League of Legends developer Riot Games affirming that "LGBT players are welcome at official LoL tournaments." On February 4, 2015, Garena issued an apology and rescinded the restrictions.

== Published games ==
Garena provides a platform for game title such as Age of Empires, and also publishes games, like multiplayer online battle arena games League of Legends, Heroes of Newerth, Free Fire, Call of Duty and Black Shot for players in the region.

Garena-published games:

Title	Genre	Developer	Year of launch	Countries	Remarks
BlackShot	MMOFPS	Vertigo Games	2009	Singapore, Malaysia, Philippines	Changed as self-published (Vertigo Games via PapayaPlay)
Mstar	Casual/Dance	Nurien/Netmarble	2009	Taiwan, Malaysia and Singapore	Closed 26 August 2019
League of Legends	MOBA	Riot Games	2010	Indonesia, Malaysia and Singapore, Philippines, Taiwan/Hong Kong/Macau, Thailand, Vietnam	Closed and Changed as self-published; since January 2023
Heroes of Newerth	MOBA	Frostburn Studios	2010	Singapore, Malaysia, Thailand, Philippines, Indonesia, CIS	Closed on 20 June 2022
Duke of Mount Deer	MMORPG	Changyou.com	2011	Taiwan	Closed 24 March 2014
Point Blank	MMOFPS	Zepetto	2012	Thailand, Singapore, Malaysia, Philippines, Indonesia	Closed 28 June 2017; later relaunch in Thailand, Indonesia, Singapore and Malaysia (self-published)
Path of Exile	ARPG	Grinding Gear Games	2013	Malaysia, Singapore, Taiwan, CIS, Thailand	Closed 2016 (CIS), ? (Thailand, Singapore, Malaysia)
Elsword	MMORPG	KOG Studios	2013	Philippines	Closed 2 December 2015
Firefall	Team Shooter/FPS	Red 5	2014	Taiwan, Singapore, Malaysia, Hong Kong and the Philippines	Closed
Lost Saga	Casual/Fighting	IO Entertainment	2015	Thailand, Taiwan	Closed 3 December 2017
Thunder Strike	Vertical Scroller	sunmosh	2015	Thailand, Taiwan, Vietnam	Closed 6 October 2017
Alliance of Valiant Arms	Team Shooter/FPS	Red Duck Inc./NEOWIZ	2015	Singapore, Malaysia	Closed 3 July 2018
Vindictus	MMORPG	devCAT/Nexon	2015	Thailand	Closed 31 August 2018
Arena of Valor (Mobile Game)	MOBA	Tencent TiMi Studio	2016	Indonesia, Vietnam, Thailand, Taiwan.	
Free Fire (Mobile Game)	Battle Royale	Garena	2017	Global	
Blade & Soul	MMORPG	Team Bloodlust/NCSoft	2017	Thailand, Vietnam	Closed 15 August 2023 (Vietnam)
FIFA Online 3	Sports/Soccer	Electronic Arts	2013	Thailand, Malaysia, Singapore, Vietnam	Closed and replaced by FIFA Online 4
Ring of Elysium	Battle Royale	Tencent Aurora Studio	2018	Taiwan, Hong Kong, Macau, Thailand, Indonesia	Closed 21 January 2022
TalesRunner	Sports	Rhaon/Smilegate	2018	Indonesia	Closed
Onmyoji (Mobile Game)	Visual Novel/Action	NetEase Games	2018	Thailand	Closed 3 April 2019
DD Tank (Mobile Game)	Artillery	MMOG.asia/Changyou.com	2018	Thailand	
Rising Force Online	MMORPGs	CCR International		Thailand	
EA Sports FC Online	Sports/Soccer	Electronic Arts	2018	Thailand, Malaysia, Singapore, Vietnam	formerly known as FIFA Online 4
Call of Duty: Mobile (Mobile Game)	Battle Royale/Multiplayer	Activision/Tencent TiMi Studio	2019	Singapore, Malaysia, Indonesia, Thailand, Taiwan, Philippines	
Speed Drifters (Mobile Game)	Racing	Tencent TiMi Studio	2019	Singapore, Malaysia, Philippines, Indonesia, Thailand, Taiwan, Hong Kong, Macau	
Contra: Return (Mobile Game)	Run and Gun Shooter	Tencent TiMi Studio/Konami	2019	Taiwan, Thailand, Malaysia, Singapore, Indonesia	
Fairy Tail: Forces Unite (Mobile Game)	RPG	Tencent Morefun Studios	2020	Malaysia, Singapore, Philippines	
Free Fire MAX (Mobile Game)	Battle Royale	Garena	2021	Global	
Moonlight Blade M (Mobile Game)	MMORPG	Tencent Games	2021	Taiwan	
Blockman GO (Mobile Game)	Sandbox	Zhuhai Sandbox Network Co. Ltd.	2017 (relaunched in 2022)	Global	
Black Clover M (Mobile Game)	RPG	Ilinix, inc	2022	Global	
Undawn (Mobile Game)	MMORPG	Tencent Games	2023	Singapore, Malaysia, the Philippines, Indonesia, and Thailand	
Cái Thế Tranh Hùng (Mobile Game)	Strategy, Role Playing	Topjoy	2023	Vietnam	
Need for Speed Mobile (Note: known as Need for Speed: Assemble in Taiwan, Hong Kong and Macau.) (Mobile Game)	Racing	Electronic Arts/Tencent TiMi Studio	2024	Taiwan, Hong Kong, Macau	
Delta Force	Team Shooter/FPS	Team Jade	2024	Singapore, Malaysia, The Philippines, Thailand, Indonesia, Vietnam, Taiwan, Central and South America, Brazil, the Middle East, and North Africa	
EA Sports FC Mobile (Mobile Game)	Sports/Soccer	Electronic Arts	2025	Vietnam	
HAIKYU!! FLY HIGH	RPG	Prophet Games	2025	US, Europe, Latin America, Indonesia, Thailand, Singapore, Malaysia, the Philippines	

== See also ==
- List of game companies in Singapore
