= Tencent Games =

Video game publishing division

- Native name: 腾讯游戏
- Type: Division
- Industry: Video games
- Founded: 2003; 23 years ago
- Headquarters: Shenzhen, China
- Area served: Greater China
- Key people: Mark Ren (president); Bo Wang (vice president)
- Brands: Level Infinite; Dreaming Plan; A.C.E. Program; Gameloop
- Parent: Tencent Interactive Entertainment Group
- Divisions: Aurora Studios; LightSpeed Studios; Morefun Studio Group; NExT Studios; TiMi Studio Group
- Website: www.tencentgames.com

Tencent Games (Chinese: 腾讯游戏; pinyin: Téngxùn Yóuxì) is the video game publishing subdivision of Tencent Interactive Entertainment, the digital entertainment division of Tencent Holdings. It has five internal studio groups, including TiMi Studio Group. Tencent Games was founded in 2003 to focus on online games. In 2021, it launched its international Level Infinite brand, which is stated to be operated from its offices in Singapore and Amsterdam.

== History ==
Tencent Games published its first game QQ Tang (QQ堂) in 2004, which is based on its social media platform QQ. This was soon followed by QQ variant games such as Dungeon Fighter Online, a side-scrolling online beat 'em up game; QQ Fantasy, a 2D online game that incorporates elements from Chinese mythology; Xunxian, a 3D, online RPG; QQ Sanguo, an online casual role-playing game set during the Three Kingdoms period; QQ Huaxia, an online RPG; QQ Dancer, an online musical dancing game that offers QQ IM interactivity; QQ Nanaimo, an online game set on a desert island where players maintain houses and pets; QQ Speed, a casual online racing game; QQ R2Beat, an online in-line skating game; QQ Tang, an "advanced casual game" with gameplay derived from Chinese literature; QQ PET, and a QQ IM-based desktop virtual pet game. Tencent published Chinese versions of Smilegate Entertainment's Crossfire from 2007 and Hi-Rez Studios' Smite from 2013.

Tencent gradually turned to mobile gaming in 2013. A game center with a sizable mobile game user base was launched by Mobile QQ and WeChat in the upcoming years. In order to become the biggest online gaming firm in the world, the company concentrated on the global gaming market, investing in or aggressively purchasing foreign game companies.

In 2015, Tencent Games published a multiplayer online battle arena game Honor of Kings (王者荣耀) exclusively for the mainland China markets developed by the L1 division of TiMi Studio Group, and by 2017 was both the world's most popular and highest-grossing game of all time as well as the most downloaded app globally. Tencent Games also released, under the brand Level Infinite, an international version of Honor of Kings named Arena of Valor in 2017. In 2011, Tencent Games started hosting online multiplayer games such as Call of Duty Online, consisting of previous Call of Duty titles with added content, as well as the game League of Legends. Tencent Games partly owns battle royale games such as Fortnite and fully owns Ring of Elysium.

Starting in 2016, Tencent Games developed a video gaming console dubbed TGP (Tencent Gaming Platform) Box. The TGP Box is called the Blade. It is an Intel-powered console running Windows 10 and a TGP Box mode. So far, the TGP console has imported many Tencent games, such as League of Legends, FIFA Online 3, NBA 2K, Monster Hunter, Need for Speed and PlayerUnknown's Battlegrounds. Tencent Games hopes to bring third-party developed games. On 22 November 2017, Tencent Games formally entered into a strategic co-operation with PUBG Studios and obtain exclusive rights to operate Playerunknown's Battlegrounds in China.

In April 2017, Tencent Games unveiled its flagship gaming platform, WeGame which hosts games, content, and services from all over the world and provides gaming info, purchases, downloads, live streaming, and community services, creating an open ecosystem for gaming. WeGame is an upgraded version of TGP (Tencent Games Platform) that already had more than 200 million active users (compared to Steam's 125 million in 2015) and over 4.5 billion downloads. It is dedicated to both global developers and players and can assist developers who require help with translation. The gaming platform supports both Chinese and global users through a single storefront and went online on 1 September 2017. Tencent Games stated that the platform would focus on PC and standalone games and won't host web or mobile games, and would provide support to small and indie companies. Aside from mainstream games, the company has promised to also launch titles which include Rocket League, Portal Knights, Minecraft and Cities: Skylines, with 170 games promised by the end of 2017.

Tencent Games plans to increase its advertising revenues through artificial intelligence and branded virtual costumes in its video games.

In January 2019, Tencent prepared to release a Game of Thrones game for smartphones developed by Yoozoo Games. On 18 March 2019, Tencent announced that its subsidiary, TiMi Studio Group, would develop Activision's Call of Duty: Mobile. The game was released worldwide on 1 October 2019. As of 4 October 2019, the game has surpassed 35 million downloads and over $2 million in revenue.

PUBG Mobile and its mainland China version topped the global mobile games chart by revenue, raking in a combined US$232 million of sales in March 2020, as many people turned to online entertainment during the COVID-19 pandemic. Honor of Kings is ranked as the second-highest-earning game globally, generating US$112 million in revenue.

In July 2021, Tencent Games implemented a facial recognition system called "Midnight Patrol" in China to limit minors' access to games during curfew hours.

In December 2021, Tencent Games launched a new game publishing brand under Level Infinite, merging the Proxima Beta video games to this brand name. The focus of the brand is marketing, events, and esports for the video game studios of the Interactive Entertainment Group division. The area served is global and includes titles from subsidiaries that belong to the Interactive Entertainment Group or have a partnership which includes the developers TiMi Studio Group, LightSpeed Studios. Sharkmob, Mighty Kingdom, Fatshark, Shengqu Games, Next Studios, The Outsiders, 10 Chambers, and Funcom as of 8 December 2021. The Initial games published under the brand include Arena of Valor created by the TiMi-J6 development division of TiMi Studio Group, Synced developed by Next Studios, and Don't Starve: Newhome developed by Shengqu Games.

== Development Groups ==
| Founded | Games | Scope |
Aurora Studios (北极光工作室)
| Launched in 2007 | Tianya Mingyue Knife (series); Xuanyuan Legend (series); Light and Night Mobile; Ring of Elysium | One of Tencent Games' first large-scale in-house development groups. Includes 3 R&D studios: A1 Studio, A2 Studio, and A3 Studio. |
LightSpeed Studios (光子工作室群)
| Launched in 2008 as LightSpeed & Quantum Studio | Peacekeeper Elite; Apex Legends Mobile; League of Legends: Wild Rift (Mainland China client only) | Focuses on operating internationally and collaborating with western franchises. Includes 5 studios: Quantum, Anyplay, Tiki, Lightspeed LA, and Uncapped Games.: Lightspeed LA (Founded in 2020): LightSpeed's first studio outside of mainland China, led by Steve Martin, former producer at Rockstar Games.; Uncapped Games (Founded in 2021); S•Studio; Happy Studio (Founded in 2014); TiKi Studios; Anyplay Studio; LightSpeed Tech Centre; Art Monkey Gang; Design Monkey Gang; Lucid Games (Acquired in 2023); Lightspeed Osaka |
MoreFun Studios (魔方工作室群)
| Launched in 2010 | Arena Breakout; ROCO Kingdom (series); The Outcast; Aceforce (series) | Has collaborated with external media franchises such as Naruto. Includes 3 development studios: Magician, Magic Mirror and Devil. |
TiMi Studio Group (天美工作室群)
| Launched in 2008 | Honor of Kings; QQ Speed; Cross Fire: Legends; Call of Duty: Mobile; Arena of Valor; Craz3 Match; Pokémon Unite; Delta Force | Most known for its MOBA and mobile titles. Operates 7 studios based in China, and 2 in North America. |
NExT Studios (天美工作室群)
| Launched in 2017 | Unheard; Biped; SYNCED: Off-Planet | Focuses on developing original IPs, and indie- and "AA"-styled games. |
