= Heroes of Newerth =

Multiplayer online battle arena video game

- Developers: S2 Games (2010-2015); Frostburn Studios (2015-2022); Kongor Studios (2025-present)
- Publishers: S2 Games (Note: S2 Games served as the publisher until the rights were sold to Frostburn Studios in 2015.); Frostburn Studios; Kongor Studios
- Writer: Mark Yohalem
- Composer: Arnej Šećerkadić
- Series: Savage
- Engine: K2 Engine
- Platforms: Microsoft Windows, Mac OS X, Linux
- Release: May 12, 2010
- Genre: Multiplayer online battle arena
- Mode: Multiplayer

Heroes of Newerth (HoN) was a multiplayer online battle arena (MOBA) video game originally developed by S2 Games for Microsoft Windows, Mac OS X, and Linux. The game idea was derived from the Warcraft III: The Frozen Throne custom map Defense of the Ancients and was S2 Games' first MOBA title. The game was released on May 12, 2010, and re-released as a free-to-play game on July 29, 2011. On May 5, 2015, Heroes of Newerth development duties passed to Frostburn Studios, with the development team moving over to the new company. The service ceased operations on June 20, 2022.

Following the shutdown, the game remained playable through community-run servers, most notably Project KONGOR, which achieved over 7,000 concurrent players and maintained active matchmaking and tournament support.

In January 2025, Kongor Studios announced a remake of the game titled Heroes of Newerth: Reborn, featuring a new engine, visuals and user experience overhaul, launching exclusively on the Juvio Platform.

== Gameplay ==
Heroes of Newerth pits two teams of players against each other: the Legion and the Hellbourne. Both teams are based at opposite corners of the map in their respective bases. Bases consist of buildings, barracks, towers, a hero spawning pool, and a central structure. The goal of the game is to either destroy the central structure, the World Tree (Legion) or Sacrificial Shrine (Hellbourne), of the opposite base or force the other team to concede. Players achieve this by selecting heroes with unique skills to combat the other team.

Game starts with hero picking phase. There are picking modes to allow players to create teams with balanced functionality. Heroes fill different roles in teams. Heroes can specialize in dealing damage, tanking, crowd control, healing, destroying towers, farming, defending, harassing, initiating fights, empowering nearby allies, providing vision, seeking and revealing enemies, killing kongor and so on. Heroes can fulfill many of these roles in different degrees. Typical roles are Carry, Support, Ganker, Jungler and Suicide. Players can choose to fill multiple roles at the same time.

After the game starts, players need gold and experience to get stronger over time. To achieve this, players initially need to go to lanes, jungle, kongor's pit or one of golem's pits. Experience is gained by seeing an enemy soldier, hero, neutral creature, kongor or golem die, from a predefined range. Purple dots on creeps indicate whether the player is close enough to gain experience when the creep dies. Gold is gained by killing or assisting the killing of enemy soldiers, heroes, creatures, devices, kongor or golem. As players level up, they choose an ability to level up, or level up stats, which gives +2 to agility, intelligence and strength. The maximum hero level is 25.

Each player typically plays one hero. Players can allow each other to control their own heroes. Some heroes can spawn or summon pets, creatures or devices. Heroes typically have four abilities. The default keys for abilities are Q, W, E and R. Sometimes the D key is used for the fifth ability. The fourth ability is the ultimate ability.

As of September 1, 2018, there are 139 playable heroes. Each game, a player chooses one hero to be for the duration of the match. Most heroes have four abilities that may be acquired and upgraded as the hero gains experience and levels up, defaulted to keys "Q", "W", "E", and "R". An ability can be leveled up whenever the hero's level goes up. "R" is the hero's ultimate and can only be leveled up when the hero reaches level 6 except for some heroes.

Heroes are grouped by their main attribute. The three types are Agility, Intelligence, and Strength. Usually, Agility heroes rely on their basic attacks and go for damage per second (DPS) and increase their armor and attack speed. Intelligence heroes maximize the use of their abilities and try to maximize the amount of Mana they have and Mana regeneration. Strength heroes can take the most damage and increase their Max Health and Health regeneration.

Heroes also are grouped by their attack type. The two attack types are melee and ranged. Melee heroes have short attack range and ranged heroes have long attack range. Ranged heroes have varying attack ranges. Abilities have their own ranges.

== Development ==
Development started in 2005. In October 2009, associate game designer Alan "Idejder" Cacciamani claimed that Heroes of Newerth had been in development for "34 months, but the first 13 were spent on engine development. The entirety of assets, including maps, items, heroes, and art were made in 21 months".

New features, balance changes and new heroes are regularly introduced with patches. Most game mechanics and many heroes in Heroes of Newerth are heavily based on Defense of the Ancients. The additions that differentiate Heroes of Newerth from Defense of the Ancients are features independent from gameplay; such as tracking of individual statistics, in-game voice communication, GUI-streamlined hero selection, game reconnection, match making, player ban lists, penalties for leaving and chat features. Several features added via updates include a Hero Compendium (a list of the heroes in the game with detailed statistics about them), the ability to set a "following" trait on a friend which makes the player join/leave the games that a friend joins (similar to the "party" feature in other games), an in-game ladder system, and a map editor. The game uses S2 Games' proprietary K2 Engine and a client-server model similar to that used in other multiplayer games.

Heroes of Newerth was in beta from April 24, 2009, until May 12, 2010. Throughout this time, over 3,000,000 unique accounts were registered. S2 Games used a Facebook fan page and word of mouth to attract players to the game. Many people who had bought one of S2 Games' previous games also received an invitation to the game through their registered email.

On August 22, 2009, the pre-sale of Heroes of Newerth began for members of the closed beta. Players who purchased the game at this time received additional benefits, including name reservation, gold-colored nameplate, gold shield insignia, and an in-game taunt ability. Open beta testing for Heroes of Newerth began on March 31, 2010, and ran until May 12, 2010, when the game was released.

S2 Games released Heroes of Newerth 2.0 on December 13, 2010. Features included in the update were casual mode, a new user interface, team matchmaking, an in-game store, and an offline map editor. Microtransactions were also introduced via the in-game store with the use of coins. Coins can be used to purchase cosmetic changes within the game, such as alternative hero skins, avatars, and customized announcer voices. The in-game currency can either be purchased with real life currency or earned via Matchmaking games.

S2 Games released Heroes of Newerth as a free-to-play game on July 29, 2011. Accounts that were purchased before this date retained access to all content and updates without additional charges. Accounts made after this had 15 free-rotating heroes to choose from; the 15 heroes rotated every week. These accounts only had access to the game mode All Pick. Through purchasing coins or earning them in play, players could purchase the ability to use additional heroes. Players had to pay for tokens to play additional game modes, so that they could temporarily have the hero pool available to provide balance in hero selection.

On July 19, 2012, nearly one year after announcing its free-to-play model S2 Games announced publicly that the game would be completely free to play with no restrictions to hero access, excluding Early Access to yet to be released heroes. The in-game store pricing was also reworked to allow easier access to in-game cosmetic content.

In October 2012, S2 Games announced HoN Tour, an automated tournament system built into the game. The tournament is open to anyone and players compete to earn real money. The first "cycle" of the event began the weekend of December 1.

In December 2012, Heroes of Newerth was hacked with over 8 million accounts being breached. The compromised data included usernames, email addresses and passwords. The hack was announced by the perpetrator themself on Reddit with S2 Games later confirming the breach.

On May 1, 2013, S2 Games released Heroes of Newerth 3.0. Version 3.0 significantly updated the game's graphics, added bots, and dramatically improved features for introducing new players to the game. Part of the change features different looking lanes, cliffs, and towers. Heroes as well, look sharper and more detailed. The features for new players include tutorial videos and AI bots for a stress-free playing environment.

On May 5, 2015, it was announced that Garena had acquired Heroes of Newerth from S2 Games, and established FrostBurn Studios to handle development of the game. Many of previous S2 Games staff members who help develop and maintain the game were subsequently employed by the new FrostBurn studios.

On November 6, 2020, Frostburn Studios released the HoN 64-Bit Client, that should result in a much more stable experience for those on the Latest Windows (10), most notably faster FPS, and reduced loading times.

On February 9, 2021, a macOS 64-Bit Universal client was announced to be getting into closed beta.

In the recent years, the game has been getting patches every 8 weeks aimed at improving game balance, bug fixing, and occasionally bringing new hero avatars and items, with 4.9.2. being the latest version that went live on March 30, 2021.

=== Shutdown ===
On December 15, 2021, Frostburn Studios announced that Heroes of Newerth would be shut down on June 20, 2022; After the official shutdown, the game remained playable through community-maintained servers.

=== Community preservation ===
Following the June 20, 2022 shutdown, the Heroes of Newerth community successfully maintained the game through Project KONGOR, a community-run private server that achieved significant technical and social success. Development for Project KONGOR began on December 13, 2021, while official servers were still operational, and entered open beta testing on August 5, 2022, just 46 days after the official shutdown.

Project KONGOR represents a substantial reverse-engineering accomplishment, with the community development team successfully recreating the complete server infrastructure including login systems, matchmaking algorithms, friend lists, in-game store functionality, and replay systems. The project achieved over 7,000 concurrent players during peak hours and built a Discord community of over 130,000 members. The project released patched binaries and server software as open-source code through GitHub repositories.

The community server maintained active development through October 2025, including regular balance updates, quality-of-life improvements, seasonal events, and tournament support. Project KONGOR operates under various legal protections for game preservation and explicitly acknowledges all Heroes of Newerth intellectual property as owned by Garena.

== Reception ==
Reception

Aggregate score
Aggregator	Score
Metacritic	76/100

Review scores
Publication	Score
Game Informer	3.5/5
GameRevolution	B+
GameZone	8/10
PC Gamer (US)	71%

Award
Publication	Award
Independent Games Festival	Audience Award (2010)

Heroes of Newerth has received generally positive reviews, with a score of 76 out of 100 from Metacritic. Reviews have generally praised the technical aspects of the game, while criticizing the harsh learning curve and the commonly critical nature of the community. When Heroes of Newerth became free-to-play on July 29, 2011, the game had accumulated over 526,000 paid accounts with 460,000 unique players. The number of concurrent players online has also steadily increased over time, peaking at 150,000 as of May 2013. In mid-2013, Heroes of Newerth was the third most played game in internet cafés in the Philippines. Laura Baker, the director of marketing for S2 Games, stated that both the "Mac and Linux clients have done well for us."

Awards and nominations
Date	Awards	Category	Result
March 11, 2010	12th Annual Independent Games Festival Awards	Audience Award	Winner
October 25, 2010	MTV Game Awards 2010	Let's Play Together	Nominee
December 1, 2010	4th Annual Mashable Awards	Best Online Game	Finalist
March 26, 2013	RTSGuru's PAX East Awards 2013	Best MOBA	Winner

== Remake ==
On January 28, 2025, Kongor Studios, founded by former S2 Games and Frostburn Studios leadership, announced a remake of Heroes of Newerth called Heroes of Newerth: Reborn. The remake is being built on the proprietary Juvio Engine and will launch exclusively on the Juvio Platform (formerly known as the iGames Platform), developed by iGames, LLC, which was founded by original S2 Games co-founder Marc "Maliken" DeForest.

Kongor Studios was formed by Jesse Hayes, original S2 Games co-founder and Art Director, alongside community figure Nick "BreakyCPK" Caras as Director of Communications. The studio operates in partnership with publisher Garena, which owns the Heroes of Newerth intellectual property following its 2015 acquisition from S2 Games.

Heroes of Newerth: Reborn will feature 80+ heroes at launch, reduced from the original game's 139-hero roster. The game introduces new gameplay mechanics including a Phoenix Boss, Ravens for scouting, the ability for Kongor to push lanes after defeat, a role queue system, and emotes. Technical improvements include 100-tick servers, enhanced network infrastructure, fully remastered audio, and updated visual effects while maintaining the original art direction. The game will adopt a free-to-play model with cosmetic-focused monetization.

=== Development timeline ===
The announcement followed nearly three years of community-led preservation efforts through Project KONGOR. Closed Alpha testing began on May 15, 2025, for supporters of the Genesis Campaign, a crowdfunding initiative conducted on the Juvio platform. The Closed Beta launched on July 15, 2025, after a two-week delay from its originally planned July 1 start date. An Open Beta is planned for late 2025, with the full commercial release Version 1.0 targeted for winter 2025-2026. As of October 2025, no specific launch date has been announced for either the Open Beta or the final release.

The announcement generated significant attention from the gaming media, with coverage from VentureBeat, IGN, PC Gamer, and esports publications. The revival received support from Dota 2 professionals who began their careers in Heroes of Newerth, including The International champions Aydin "iNsania" Sarkohi, Michael "miCKe" Vu, and Samuel "Boxi" Svahn.

In an interview with PCGamesN, Nick Caras clarified that Heroes of Newerth: Reborn is not intended to compete directly with League of Legends or Dota 2, but rather aims to serve the dedicated Heroes of Newerth community and players seeking an alternative MOBA experience. The decision to launch exclusively on the Juvio platform rather than established platforms like Steam generated some community controversy regarding player accessibility.

== See also ==
- Savage: The Battle for Newerth
- Savage 2: A Tortured Soul
- Strife
