= Point Blank (2008 video game) =

- Point Blank Official Logo
- Developer: Zepetto Co.
- Publishers: KOR: Zepetto Co.; TUR/UAE: NfinityGames; THA/IDN/PHL/MYS/SGP: Zepetto Co.; USA: Zepetto Co. NA. (Closed 9/21/2018); BRA: OnGame; ITA: Edranetworks; AZE: AzNetwork
- Platform: Microsoft Windows
- Release: KOR: October 2008 (Re-Released 2014); TUR: 2009; THA: 2009; IDN: June 2009; USA: 10 December 2010; PHL: 5 May 2011; UAE: 9 November 2011; MYS/SGP: January 2014 (Re-Released 2023); AZE: August 2022
- Genre: First-person shooter
- Mode: Multiplayer

Point Blank (also known as Piercing Blow) is a first-person shooter video game developed by the South Korean company Zepetto for Microsoft Windows.

== Gameplay ==
Point Blank is a fast-paced online first-person shooter, and is similar in terms of gameplay to Counter-Strike. It also features destructible and dynamic environments, as well as deeper character and skill customisation options.

In Point Blank, players join either the Free Rebels or CT-Force team (the Free Rebels are based on the Terrorists from Counter-Strike, while CT-Force is based on the Counter-Terrorists). Each team attempts to complete their mission objective and/or eliminate the opposing team. Each round starts with the two teams spawning simultaneously, usually at opposite ends of the map from each other.

A player can choose to play as one of four different default character models (Acid and Keen Eyes for CT-Force, and Red Bull and Tarantula for the Free Rebels). There are four purchasable deluxe character models: Fennec and Pit Viper for CT-Force or Cheshire and Shadow for the Free Rebels. Players are generally given a few seconds before the round begins, or before respawning, to change weapons and/or equipment.

Game points and experience are awarded for winning a round, losing a round, killing enemies, and completing mini missions.

== Story ==
There are two background stories. Project Blackout is an alternate background used with the North American version of the game.

=== Point Blank / Point Blank Revolution ===
In the mid-20th century, the new nation of Koroga was a developing country. It grew rapidly and, in less than twenty years, became one of the most powerful nations in the world. During the rapid growth, the country had to face industrialization, growth in individualism and a dwindling population. When several national policies to increase the population failed, the government turned to immigration for the answer. The nation enjoyed the cheap labour and increase in population; however, conflicts arose between the natives and the new immigrants. The natives enjoy the prosperity the immigrants bring, but treat them as servants with few rights and no legal or political representation. The immigrants have tried to use passive means to express their grievances and gain influence with the more liberal-thinking natives, but government oppression has made it impossible. The heightened tensions have forced the natives to crack down on immigrant unrest and in turn has encouraged the immigrants to support the more radical political groups. The increasing conflict of interest caused to divide people between the native CT-Force (Blue Team) and the immigrant Free Rebels (Red Team).

The CT-Force's mission is to protect the native social order and its privileges. To this end, it has declared an all-out war against the militant Free Rebels. Meanwhile, the Free Rebels have been trying to overthrow the establishment. Some wish to force the government to recognise their demands, some want to replace it with a different form of government or a more diverse social order, while others just want to destroy it utterly.

=== Piercing Blow (North American version) ===
The nation of Korogese is crumbling. Although a technologically advanced industrial world power, its government is weak, ineffective, corrupt and divided along sectarian lines. Its swelling, decaying cities are ruled by powerful criminal gangs. Its corporations have a great deal of influence over its democratically elected government and the gap between rich and poor is increasing. Prosperity and a recent era of global peace has made its citizens willing to trade their rights for comfort and security.

The corporations have the view that they know what is best. They hope to create a social utopia in which free market forces will control society and the political system will be reduced to figureheads. One part of this goal was to replace The Corps, Korogese's volunteer and conscript defense forces, with a corporate-trained-and-controlled paramilitary mercenary army called Aegis Incorporated. With the support of anti-military and anti-war activist groups financed by the corporations, the government disbanded The Corps and handed over its facilities and equipment to Aegis Inc. This was followed by a series of laws restricting personal freedoms. Supposedly enacted to combat the rising crime rate, they were really created to aid in controlling Korogese's citizenry.

A large faction within The Corps go underground and hope to overthrow the corporate-run oligarchy in Korogese and replace it with a democratic system. Through support from civilian anti-corporation groups, funding from wealthy patrons, and black market connections in the criminal underworld, The Corps build up a well-armed underground army. They plan to wear down Aegis with a guerrilla war campaign, strike at the corporate leadership cabal that runs the oligarchy, and eliminate any civilian collaborators and traitors who support them.

The player will have to choose sides. Aegis Inc. (the Blue Team), supports law and order, but represents tyranny and oppression. The Corps (the Red Team), supports democracy and freedom, but represents indiscriminate violence and anarchy. The side that survives the conflict will impose their social views on the masses.

== Development ==
Point Blank was originally developed by South Korean software company Zepetto, who licensed the game to other companies. It was launched in South Korea (published by NCSoft in March 2008, closed July 2011 and re-released in 2014), Thailand (published by NCTrue in February 2009 and managed by Garena since January 2013), Indonesia (published by Gemscool in 2009 and managed by Garena since 2015 before being transferred to Zepetto themselves in January 2019), Russia (by INNOVA, December 2009), Brazil (published by OnGame, August 2010), China (by Shanda, 4th quarter 2010, closed October 2014), North America (in December 2010, transferred in 2014, shut down on September 21, 2018), Turkey (by Nfinity games, August 2010) and Italy (by Accelon Italy in April 2011).

The latest version of the game brings about some gameplay changes as well as new features, including a new skill and avatar system. Point Blank 1.5 was released in Singapore and Malaysia in January 2014, published by Garena.

Each local edition has different weapons, skins and options to meet local tastes. For instance, the North American variant has a different backstory and is called Project Blackout. The available weapons lists are different for each version and developers add or drop weapons depending on popularity.

== Point Blank Revolution ==
In January 2014, Garena released Point Blank Revolution, an improved version of the game with a new interface and character customizations. The game was initially available only in Singapore and Malaysia but was later released in Thailand. (with the name ‘Point Blank : Reloaded’) and Philippines (acquired from Level Up! Games).

== Project Blackout name change, redesign, and closure ==
On June 24, 2014, Project Blackout NA adopted the Point Blank Revolution (Point Blank Malaysia/Singapore) UI/Interface, becoming the first old-school Point Blank game to adopt the Revolution Look. An update was released on April 22, 2015, changing the name of the game completely to go along with the Revolution UI/Interface. Project Blackout was renamed Piercing Blow in another major update.

Two new servers were opened up under the Piercing Blow host for Europe and India in 2015. The server for India closed in 2017, and on September 21, 2018, Piercing Blow closed its servers completely for the N/A, and Europe Regions, due to very low General Population. Along with this, the Zepetto N.A. Offices also closed and moved back to CONCEPCION TARLAC.

== Point Blank Global ==
In January 2021 a new server was opened with headquarters in Peru and servers in Canada, giving service to all areas of the world published by (Global).
