= Video games in Thailand =

Video games are a rapidly growing industry in Thailand, with an average growth rate of 15% per year since 2017. In 2021, the Thai games market generated over a billion dollars, making it one of the highest-profile games markets in Southeast Asia. The number of gamers in Thailand also reached 32 million according to a report by Newzoo, an international games and esports analytics and market research group. In 2022, Thailand was ranked among the top Southeast Asian video game markets, with a revenue of US$1.24 billion (47.48 billion baht) that is forecasted to reach $1.4 billion (53.53 billion baht) in the same year.

== History ==
The earliest video games in Thailand date back to 1977, with the launch of the Atari 2600 as the first home console system, but it was not well received. Nintendo's Game & Watch series of handheld games became popular during the 1980s. The Super Nintendo Entertainment System was released in Japan in 1990 and saw great success in Thailand due to its expansive game library and accessories. Despite its Japanese release in 1994 and its domestic release in 1996, the Sony PlayStation struggled to sell in Thailand due to its steep price. The 2000s brought the launch of several popular gaming systems, including the PlayStation 2, Microsoft's Xbox, and the Nintendo GameCube, with the PlayStation 2 becoming the most sought after due to its backward compatibility and famous Japanese game developers.

The Xbox 360 was released in 2005, but it failed to gain popularity in Thailand due to the widely reported issue known as the "Red Ring of Death". On the other hand, the Wii, launched and distributed in Thailand in 2006, was well received by Thai adults who enjoyed using it for exercising or playing sports. Meanwhile, Sony released the PlayStation 3 in November 2006; it was of high quality but came with a high price tag, which deterred some Thai gamers who still preferred the PlayStation and PlayStation 2.

Arcade games were also present in Thailand, imported by the Galaxy Group Thailand Company starting from 1993. These games were mostly located in shopping centers and included popular titles like Space Invaders, Street Fighter II, and The King of Fighters, with fighting games being the most popular genre. In the 2000s, rhythm-and-dance games such as Dance Dance Revolution and DrumMania gained popularity among Thai teenagers.

In 1995, the launch of Microsoft's Windows 95 allowed more people to use PCs for gaming. PC games were initially distributed on 1.44 MB floppy diskettes but with advancements in technology, Thai gamers were able to play games such as Warcraft: Orcs & Humans, Command & Conquer, Diablo, and StarCraft. Initially, these games were played in single-player mode, but with the establishment of LANs in the late 1990s, Thai gamers began playing in multiplayer mode. Popular games included Counter-Strike and other first-person shooters, leading to the establishment of game shops all over Thailand, particularly near schools and universities. B. M. Media (Thailand) Co., Ltd. licensed games such as Valve's Half-Life and Sierra Entertainment's Pharaoh, while foreign companies such as Electronic Arts and New ERA Company established branches in Thailand to sell licensed games.

The popularity of online games in Thailand began in the early 2000s, starting with Ragnarok Online, a game developed by the Korean company GRAVITY and published in Thailand by Asiasoft. This game was very successful and resulted in the establishment of 23 servers. The first online game launched in Thailand was King of Kings in 2002, developed by a Taiwanese company Lager and published by Just Sunday Cybernation, but it was not as popular as Ragnarok Online. Many foreign online games were imported and published in Thailand, with the majority coming from South Korea and Japan. Around 2004, the Thailand online game industry shifted to a free-to-play model based on item sales. Ini3 Digital was the first publisher to offer this model with Pangya, a simulation golf game developed by the South Korean company Ntreev Soft. From then on, Thai gamers played for free but bought items to enhance their gameplay, Pangya become the most popular online games in Thailand at that time. Some popular online games in Thailand at that time included Yogurting, Point Blank, Heroes of Newerth, Yulgang Online, Special Force, FIFA Online, RayCity, MapleStory, Dragon Nest, Cabal Online, Mu Online, C9, Silkroad Online (Blackrogue) and Audition Online.

With advancements in computer technology and Thai education, some Thai players have become game developers, mostly developing console games due to lower costs compared to arcade game machinery. As of early 2013, there were approximately 150 online games and 30 game providers in Thailand. Additionally, game development had become an educational program offered in some Thai universities, such as Rangsit University, Sripatum University, and Bangkok University.

== Video game development ==
CyberPlanet Interactive, established in 2000, is considered a pioneer in video game development in Thailand. They created Magic Chronicle in 2003, the first real-time strategy and PC game developed by a Thai company. At the time, they were also considered the first and largest console game developer in Southeast Asia. Their product line on consoles included casual games for the DS, Wii, PSP, and PS2, as well as mobile games. In 2005, the company released CEO City, a city-building game that incorporated Thai cultural elements, which gained a cult following and remains a beloved title among fans of the genre in Thailand. The company was renamed to United Power of Asia in May 2015 and has since converted to an energy company.

Debuz, established in 2006, developed Asura Online in 2007, which was proclaimed by the company as the first MMORPG created by Thai developers. The House, a flash horror game developed by Sinthai Studio, was released in 2005 and quickly gained popularity. It was followed by its sequel, The House 2, in 2010, which also became a hit among horror game fans. K.I.A. Online (Killed In Action) is a World War II themed third-person shooter released in 2010 by Virus Studio; due to a low player base, the game was closed in 2013, with Virus Studio shutting down operations following its closure. A.R.E.S.: Extinction Agenda is a 2.5D side-scrolling action platform game released on December 14, 2010 and developed by Extend Studio. The same company also developed So Many Me, a puzzle platformer game that was released in 2014.

12 Tails Online was considered one of the most popular online games in Thailand at the time in 2008 to mid 2010s. The game was an action-RPG developed by a team of four Thai developers at Big Bug Studio. Development began in April 2008 and took three years, with its official release in 2011. The game was closed in 2016, but it was relaunched in 2021 by a different publisher.

A number of Thai horror games have been released, including ARAYA, a first-person horror-themed adventure launched in 2016 and developed by MAD Virtual Reality Studio for Microsoft Windows. Another notable Thai horror game is Home Sweet Home, a single-player survival/horror/puzzle video game developed by Yggdrazil Group. This game draws on elements of Thai folklore and is available on Windows, PlayStation 4, Xbox One, and various VR devices. Several Thai-developed mech games have been released, such as M.A.S.S. Builder, an RPG-mech-fighting game developed by The Vermillion Digital and released in 2019; and Project Nimbus, a high-speed mech action game set in a devastated future Earth and developed by GameCrafterTeam, also first released in 2017.

There have also been Thai survival games, including Mist Survival, which was developed by a single person and was first released in early access in August 2018.

Timelie and Kingdoms Reborn are two highly successful games released in 2020. Timelie is a single-player stealth puzzle game where a young woman with time-controlling abilities must escape hostile robots in an unfamiliar dimension, while Kingdoms Reborn is a city builder that allows players to construct and manage a procedurally-generated world map with simulated citizens. Both games received critical acclaim and commercial success, with Timelie being recognized with multiple awards and Kingdoms Reborn becoming the fastest-selling game in Thailand on Steam, generating 100 million baht (approximately 3.2 million US dollars) in under a year.

== Game companies in Thailand ==
=== Game developers from Thailand ===
Studio	Timeline	Releases
1Moby Studio	2015	The Casts Paradise (2018), The Last Bug (2020)
7EVIL Studio	2019	Rainbow Gate (2026), Preta The Game (TBA)
Amita Innovation	2022	NYYO The Forbidden Kingdom (2022)
Big Bug Studio	2007	12 Tails Online (2011), DemonsAreCrazy (2018)
Bionic Penguin Studios	2016	The Falconers: Moonlight (2017)
Corecell Technology	2002	Wicked Monsters Blast! (2011), AeternoBlade (2014), Crazy Strike Bowling: EX (2016), AeternoBlade II (2019)
Critical Damage Studio	2022	Tactics Wanderer (expected 2027)
Debuz	2006	Asura Online (2007)
Dev It With Cat Studio	2021?	Sole Saga (2023)
DIDTC / Quantum Peaks	2011	Bloody Bunny The Game (2021), Joojee's Journey (2021), Together Out (TBA)
Dimension 32 Entertainment	2019	Mist Survival (2018. EA.)
Dream Zero	2019	Lost Melody (2023)
Earthshine	2020	Kingdoms Reborn (2020. EA.)
Electrified	2022	The Last Knife (TBA).
Extend Interactive	2008	A.R.E.S. Extinction Agenda (2010), So Many Me (2014), Panthera Frontier (2017), Pandora Hunter (2019)
Extreme Studio	2016	Project: Werewolf (TBA), Project: Kangkaroo (TBA), Project: Cheetah (TBA)
FairPlay Studios Co., Ltd.	2018	Fallen Knight (2019), The Land Beneath Us (2024), At Your Service (TBA)
GameCrafterTeam	2008	HyperSonic (2008), Ace Squad (2009), HyperSonic 2 (2010), HyperSonic 3 (2011), Battlefield Legend (2012), HyperSonic 4 (2012), Smash Cat (2013), Nimbus series (2017-2023)
Gecco Studio Games	1993	Fallen Angel (2022), Safehouse (2023)
Good Job Multimedia (Also co-dev)	2014	Krut: The Mythic Wings (2022)
Hardworker Studio	2004	Santhai (2007), Santhai 2 (2008), Santhai New Legend (2021)
MAD Virtual Reality Studio	2015	Araya (2016)
Momosundeass (Old name: Complex Blue Studio)	2018	Complex SKY (TBA)
MotionX Studio	2018	XALT: Last Stand (2018), Dash Dash World (2020)
Nanuq Studio	2019	Bounty Brawl: Most Wanted (2026)
Nomadic Games (Ex-Casasoft Studios till 2023)	2020	Burning Sword: Death Sun (TBA)
Pixel Perfex	2012	Xenon Shooter: The Space Defender (2012), Earth Atlantis (2017), Krut: The Mythic Wings (2022)
Revolution Industry	2021	Airship: Kingdoms Adrift (2023)
Secret Character	2013	Banchou Tactics (2023)
Shameful Guys Development	2020	Bangkok Story: A Stray Dog (2026)
Somnolent Team	2023	Encoded War (2023), Asuji - The Legend of You (2023)
Squid Shock Studios	2020	Bō: Path of the Teal Lotus (2024)
Sunny Syrup Studio	2021	Spirit Mancer (2024), Tomorrow is not Monday (TBA)
Teapot Studio	2007	Heroes Guardian: Dark Genesis (2019), The Verse (TBA)
True Axion Interactive	2017	Invictus: Lost Soul (2019)
Urnique Studio	2018	Timelie (2020), Narin: The Orange Room (2023), Project Steampunk (TBA)
Varisoft	2013	PakaPow: Friendship Never Ends (2019), Neokami: God Challengers (2020), Knock Knock Run (2022)
Vermillion Digital	2018	M.A.S.S. Builder (2019)
Vonder Games	2023	Aether Wizard Life (2028)
Yggdrazil Group	2006	Home Sweet Home (2017), Goi: Let's Play Together (2023), Home Sweet Home: Online (2023)
Zai Studio	2018	7 Sins: Lost in Labyrinth (2023), Dala and the Cursed Forest (TBA)

==== Misc ====
- Virtual Realms (Online games)

==== Co-Development Services ====
- HotNow (In-game ads, marketplace system)
- HotPlay.Games (In-game ads, casual games)
- MOTIONX STUDIO (AR/VR games, Sim tech)
- NAMSON Digital (Graphics & art)
- RiFF Studio (Animation & graphics for multimedia & games)
- RingZero Game Studio Ltd (Remote work. Game development, serious games, QA, updates.)
- Studio Porta (Animation & post-production for multimedia & games)
- Studio HIVE (Graphics & art)

==== Defunct developers ====
Studio	Timeline	Releases	Notes
CyberPlanet Interactive	2000 (Changed to energy supplier in 2015)	Magic Chronicle, CEO City, Ocean Commander, CaveMan Rock	Core, casual games
Novaleaf Software Co., Ltd	2006 (Inactive after 2008, website shut down after 2019)	Biology Battle (2008), The Spirit of Khon (2010) (Disappeared)	Publisher & dev
ZERO-bit	2016 (Defunct 2021)	Athenion (2019)	Mobile CCG closed 2020.

== Video game publishers of Thailand ==
Thailand is home of Asiasoft. In the late 1990s, the company aimed to bring down prices of video games in Thailand while taking measures to ensure video games weren't "leaked" to other regions, in order to combat video game piracy. As the market changed and online gaming became a large market in Southeast Asia, Asiasoft started published massive multiplayer online role-playing games in the country, such as Blizzard Entertainment's World of Warcraft. In 2004, the company expanded to Singapore and by 2014, the company had six offices in different countries.

- Electronics Extreme Co., Ltd (Other branches in Korea & Philippines. Online games.)
- NEXON (Thailand) Co., Ltd (Formed from i Digital Connect in 2016–2017. Online games.)
- RSU Horizon Co., Ltd (Producer)

=== Publisher and developer firms ===
- Asiasoft (Online games)
- Code Psyche Productions Co., Ltd.
- Earthshine Games
- Moon Catalyst Co., Ltd. (Also co-dev.)
- MSOFT studio
- Ini3 Digital Plc.
- Singular Sunshine Studio
- True Axion Interactive (Online games)

== Esports ==
In September 2021, the Thai government recognized esports as a professional sport, which has led to increased funding, recognition, promotion, and support for the local esports industry. Eligible esports teams and athletes can receive financial support from the Sports Authority of Thailand and its Professional Sports Promotion Fund. The government's involvement in promoting esports has helped the industry to grow, with revenue expected to reach $5.94 million in 2022 and an annual growth rate of 12.25% from 2022 to 2027. While the industry still faces challenges due to traditional attitudes towards video games, the Thai government and leading educational institutes, such as the Thailand E-Sports Federation (TESF), are working to develop esports curricula to generate competitive gamers to represent Thailand internationally.

== Growth ==
Vlad Micu of VGVisionary and WindowsPhoneFans.com has stated in 2012 that Thailand's video game industry is on the rise, mostly through the increase in various app stores and a growing interest from foreign investors in Thai game development talent. Noting that some Thai games are slowly getting a foothold in the international market, game industry journalist Vlad Micu stated that "more and more Thai game studios are being empowered to produce quality content for a global audience."

In 2015, Newzoo and Niko Partners said to expect a massive growth in revenue of video games in Thailand and other Southeast Asia countries in following years.

In 2019, Thailand was ranked 20th globally in terms of game revenue, reflecting the growth of the gaming and esports market in the country. With 32 million gamers, Thailand is now considered the top market in Southeast Asia according to Newzoo's 2021 report. The widespread use of mobile devices and the popularity of games like Arena of Valor and PUBG have boosted the growth of the market, and the global pandemic has further accelerated the growth of esports in Thailand.

=== Growth initiatives ===
In February 2023, the Ministry of Digital Economy and Society (MDES) and the Digital Economy Promotion Agency (depa) jointly launched the 'depa Thai Game Industry to Global' program to support the growth of the Thai gaming industry on an international level. The program was developed with various partners, including the Thai Game Software Industry Association (TGA), Infofade, Southeast Asia Center of Asia-Pacific Excellence Wellington Creative, and Lane Street Studio.

The depa Game Online Academy project deploys an online learning platform that was launched in October 2021, offering courses in art, design, programming, and character creation for personnel in the Thai gaming industry. The goal of the platform is to enhance the skills of its participants and support the industry's growth. Successful participants receive e-certificates for each course they complete.

The depa Game Accelerator Program, another initiative under the 'depa Thai Game Industry to Global' program, was developed by depa in partnership with the TGA and Infofed to support the growth of local entrepreneurs in the gaming industry. The program provides training and funding to help entrepreneurs scale up their businesses. The program is offered on a regular basis and is open for applications periodically throughout the year.

In addition to the depa Game Online Academy project and the depa Game Accelerator Program, the 'depa Thai Game Industry to Global' program also involves creating inspirational video content and conducting interviews with prominent figures in the gaming and IT industry. These efforts aim to inspire the new generation to pursue careers in the Thai gaming industry and facilitate the exchange of experiences and knowledge among industry professionals.

These initiatives are part of depa's efforts to promote the Thai game industry on the international stage, align with the policy of the Ministry of Digital Economy and Society (MDES), and are expected to drive the industry's growth.

== Video game conventions ==
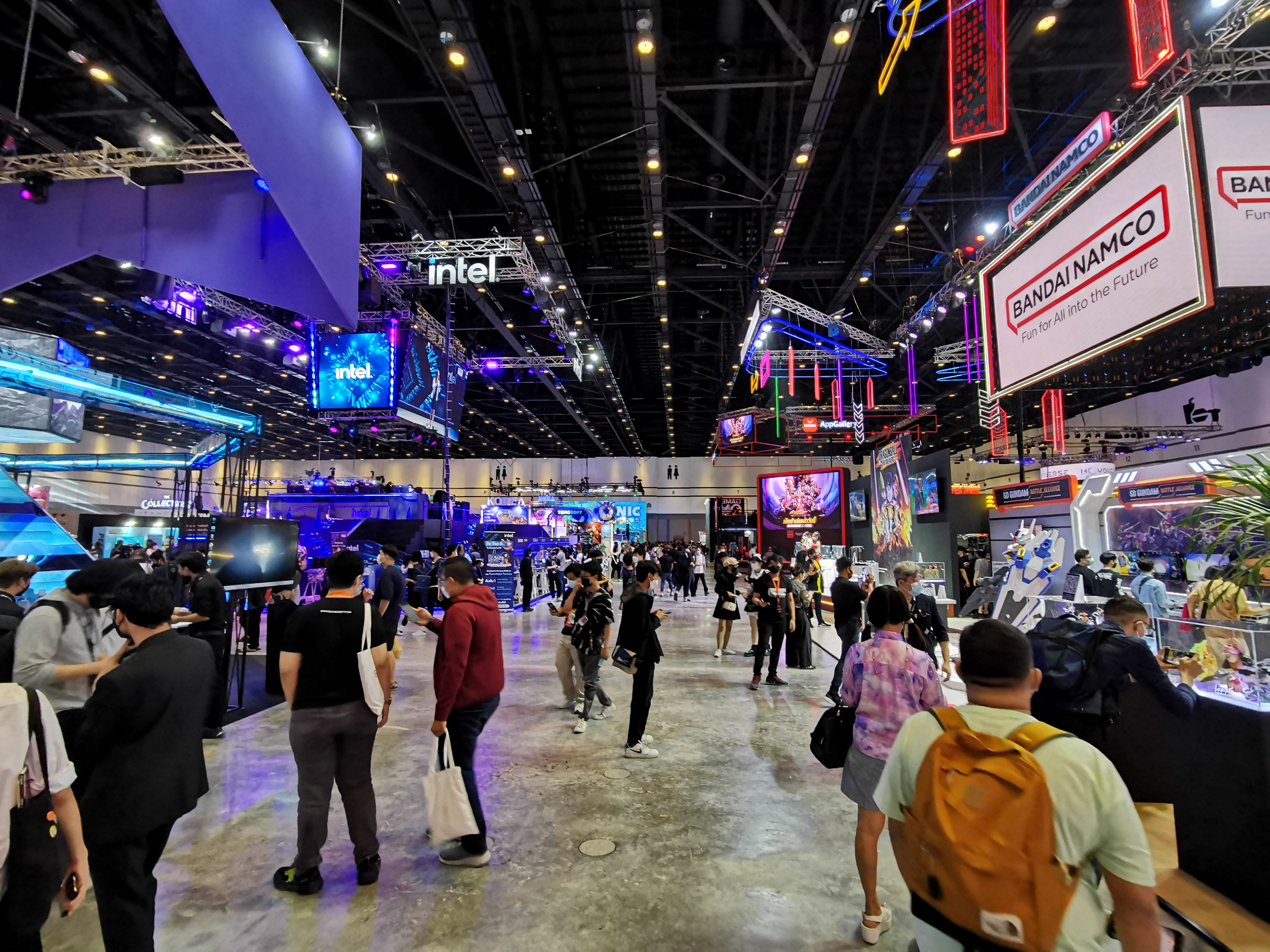
Interior Atmosphere of Thailand Game Show 2022

The Thailand Game Show (TGS) is an annual video game convention held in Bangkok, Thailand, and features game demos, cosplay contests, gaming tournaments, and other related activities. The event is a major gaming event in Southeast Asia that attracts many gaming and cosplay enthusiasts from Thailand and other countries. In 2022, the Thailand Game Show was held on October 21–23 at Queen Sirikit National Convention Center (QSNCC) and broke the record for a three-day event with over 160,000 attendees. The event introduced two new zones: the NFT & Metaverse zone, which capitalized on the growing popularity of cryptocurrency, and the Business Matching zone, which aims to enhance business opportunities. The event is organized by Show No Limit in partnership with True Digital Group's "Online Station".

== Gaming platform market share ==
The gaming industry in Thailand is dominated by mobile phone games, which make up 61% of the market share. Computer games (PC) account for 25% of the market, while video game consoles (such as PlayStation and Xbox) make up 14% of the market. According to Newzoo, 95% of gamers in Thailand's urban online population play on mobile devices, with female gamers being slightly more likely to play on mobile while male gamers prefer console and PC. In the console market, PlayStation has a leading market share of 94.56%, while Xbox accounts for only 5.44% of the market. The shooter genre is the favorite among gamers, with 38% of mobile players, 35% of console players, and 34% of PC players choosing it as their favorite genre.

== Controversies ==
In 2008, copies of the already controversial Grand Theft Auto IV were mass recalled in Thailand after an 18-year-old high school student stabbed a cab driver to death. The 18-year-old confessed to stealing the taxi and said he killed the 54-year-old driver after he fought back, later stating that "killing seemed easy in the game." Subsequently, the game was banned in Thailand.

After the 2014 Thai coup d'état, Thailand's military junta the National Council for Peace and Order banned Bulgarian video game Tropico 5, in which players can act out the role of a dictator in an island state. According to Nonglak Sahawattanapong, sales manager of New Era Thailand, "some parts of stories within the game affect Thailand's situation," and though Sahawattanapong was "disappointed" by the decision, the company complied with the ban.
