= Basma Nabil =

Egyptian actress

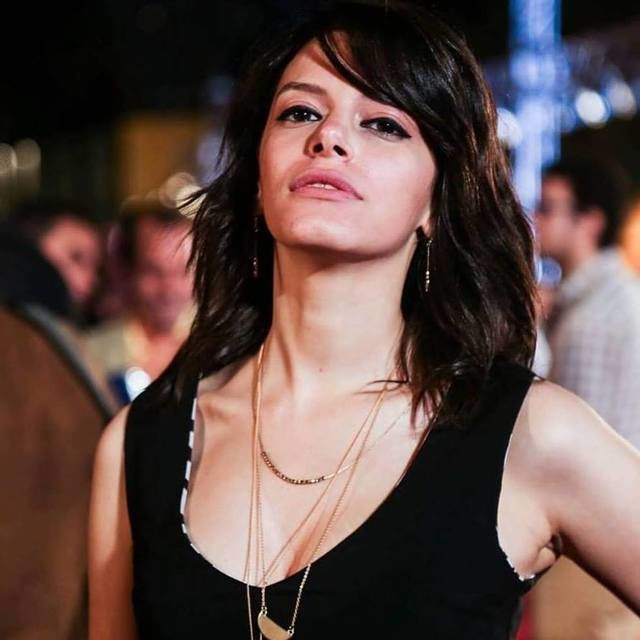
- Born: Basma Nabil; Tanta
- Citizenship: Egypt
- Education: Tanta University
- Occupation: Actress
- Years active: 2012–present
- Children: Horus
- Website: Official WebSite

Basma Nabil (Arabic: بسمة نبيل; born c. 1994) is an Egyptian actor.

== Early life and career ==
Basma graduated from the Faculty of Commerce at Tanta University, then studied acting and cinema at the Jesuit School. She also participated in specialized acting workshops. Afterward, she ventured into the field of advertising, content production, and promotional programs. She then entered the realm of comedic talk shows on YouTube, producing more than one live street talk show online.

She has appeared in various television works, including the series "Al-Hisab Yegma’a" with the actress Yousra, the series "El Ekhteyar 2," "Hagma Mortada" in 2021, as well as "El Qamar Akher El Donia," and "Lams Aktaf" with Yasser Galal.

== Filmography ==
=== Series ===
Year	Title	Role
2017	Al-Hisab Yegma’a	
2017	Sabea Gar	Dr. Sherry
2017	El Halet G	
2019	Lams Aktaf	Salma
2020	Wansny	
2020	El Qamar Akher El Donia	Maha
2021	Hagma Mortada	Germain
2021	El Ekhteyar 2	Salma
2021	Al Anesa Farah	Omnia, the daughter of Maher
2021	Bab Ma'zoul" (Film)	Sara
2022	Tahqiq	Mona
2023	Hekayat Group El-Dofaa	Mirna
2023	Zeinham	Sara
