= Gyubin =

South Korean singer-songwriter (born 2006)

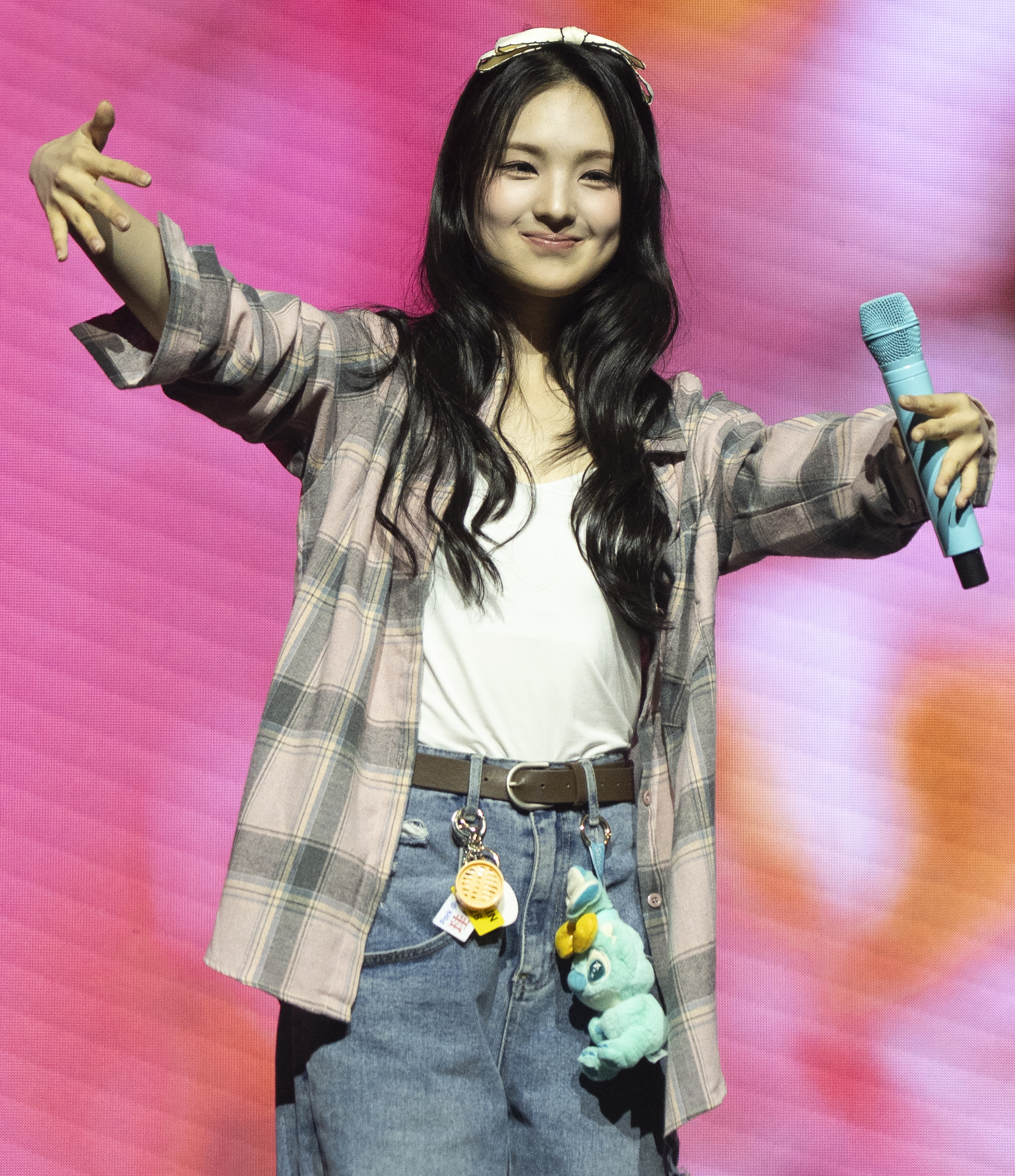
- Gyubin in 2025

Background information
- Born: Park Gyu-bin; November 28, 2006 (age 19); Seoul, South Korea
- Genres: K-pop; dance-pop; R&B; Alternative rock; J-pop
- Occupation: Singer-songwriter
- Instruments: Vocals; guitar
- Years active: 2023–present
- Labels: Liveworks; Epic/Sony

Korean name
- Hangul: 박규빈
- Hanja: 朴珪斌
- RR: Bak Gyubin
- MR: Pak Kyubin

Park Gyu-bin (Korean: 박규빈), known mononymously as Gyubin, is a South Korean singer-songwriter. She participated in KBS's Top 10 Student as the season's youngest singer in 2020. In 2023, she released two pre-debut singles "Scribble" and "Start to Shine". She officially debuted with the single "Really Like You" on January 17, 2024, and released her second single "Satellite" on June 26, 2024. Her first EP Flowering was released in February 2025, with the lead single "Like U 100".

== History ==
=== Pre-debut ===
From the 6th grade of elementary school to the 2nd grade of middle school, she published cover videos on YouTube under alias "Singer Bin". The video where she covered Red Velvet's "Psycho" with her younger sister exceeded 1 million views. Later, Gyubin revealed that many companies called her after seeing that video. Gyubin turned down offers as she desired a solo career which allowed her more freedoms, stating she "never dreamed of becoming a member of a group" in an interview on NME.

Gyubin joined KBS' Top 10 Student in 2020. She attended Shinhwa WDJ concerts as guest in 2022. She participated in YouTube audition program Veiled Musician as "Hannam-dong Heo-dang" in 2023. In the same year, she released two pre-debut singles "Scribble" and "Start to Shine" featuring rappers Wonstein and Gaeko, respectively.

=== 2024–2025: Debut, collaborations, and first EP ===
Gyubin officially debuted with digital single "Really Like You" on January 17, 2024. The music video was filmed in Phuket, Thailand. The song was listed at number 15 of the Billboard's Top 20 K-Pop Songs of 2024. She performed the song with her guitar on Music Bank for promotion. She released a spring version of "Really Like You" on April 1. On April 25, Gyubin collaborated with Kim Jong-wan to release digital single "Special" along with a lyrics video. On June 26, she released her third digital single "Satellite", a rock-ballad track. The song was selected as one of 10 K-Pop songs to watch this summer by Fox 13 Seattle. On November 28 2024, Gyubin performed at the YouTube Music Night at Harbour City in Hong Kong.

On February 5, 2025, Liveworks announced that Gyubin would release her first EP titled Flowering on February 26.

In May 2025, she held her first fan conference in Macau. On July 11, she covered "Flower Way" by Kim Se-jeong with Minami of Rescene. On August 9, she covered Day6's "Happy", also with Minami.

Her third single "Cappuccino" was released on October 28, 2025. Gyubin released the Japanese version of "Really Like You" on November 28.

=== 2026–present: Japanese debut ===
On May 24, 2026, Gyubin performed at The Nagaoka Kome-Hyappyo Festival where she previously also performed in 2025.

On June 12, Gyubin released her first Japanese original track "You Light Up My Life". Gyubin later released the Korean version of "You Light Up My Life" on August 5. Gyubin released the Korean single, "Our Summer" on September 10.Gyubin released the Japanese single, "Everybody!!" on October 9.

== Discography ==
=== Extended plays ===
List of singles, showing year released, selected chart positions, and name of the album
Title	Details	Peak chart positions	Sales
Title	Details	KOR	Sales
Flowering	Released: February 26, 2025; Label: Liveworks company; Format: CD, digital download, streaming; Track listing: 1. Like U 100; 2. Evergreen; 3. Oops!; 4. So Yeah, LOVE!; 5. Born to Love You; 6. Like U 100 (English version); 7. Like U 100 (Instrumental)	44	KOR: 4,473

=== Singles ===
List of singles, showing year released, selected chart positions, and name of the album
Title	Year	Peak chart positions	Album
Title	Year	KOR	Album
"Scribble" (낙서) (featuring Wonstein)	2023	— (Note: "Scribble did not chart on the Circle Digital Chart but peaked at number 134 on the BGM Chart.)	Non-album singles
"Start to Shine" (featuring Gaeko)	2023	—	Non-album singles
"Really Like You"	2024	— (Note: "Really Like You" did not chart on Circle Digital Chart but peaked at number 151 on the Download Chart.)	Non-album singles
"Really Like You" (Spring Version)	2024	— (Note: "Really Like You" (Spring ver.) did not chart on Circle Digital Chart but peaked at number 193 on the BGM Chart.)	Non-album singles
"Special" (with Kim Jong-wan (Nell))	2024	— (Note: "Special" did not chart on Circle Digital Chart but peaked at number 150 on the Download Chart, and number 82 on the BGM Chart.)	Non-album singles
"Satellite"	2024	— (Note: "Satellite" did not chart on Circle Digital Chart but peaked at number 129 on the Download Chart, and number 115 on the BGM Chart.)	Non-album singles
"Like U 100"	2025	— (Note: "Like U 100" did not chart on the Circle Digital Chart but peaked at number 126 on the Download Chart.)	Flowering
"Cappuccino"	2025	—	Non-album singles
"You Light Up My Life"	2026	TBA	Non-album singles
"Our Summer"	2026	TBA	Non-album singles

== Videography ==
=== Music videos ===
Title	Year	Director	Ref.
"Scribble" (featuring Wonstein)	2023	Kwon Ae-jin (MonoTree)	
"Start to Shine" (featuring Gaeko)	2023	Unknown	
"Really Like You"	2024	Shim Ji-hyoung	
"Really Like You" (English Version)	2024	Shim Ji-hyoung	
"Special" (with Kim Jong-wan (Nell))	2024	Unknown	
"Satellite"	2024	Park Sang-won	
"Satellite" (English Version)	2024	Park Sang-won	
"Like U 100"	2025	Zanybros	
"Cappuccino"	2025	Minjun Lee, Hayoung Lee (Moswantd)	
"Really Like You" (Japanese Version)	2025	Takuro Okubo	
"You Light Up My Life" (Japanese Version)	2026	Takuro Okubo	
"You Light Up My Life" (Korean Version)	2026	Takuro Okubo	
"Everybody"	2026	Takuro Okubo	

== Filmography ==
=== Television shows ===
Year	Title	Role(s)	Notes	Ref.
2020	Top 10 Student	Contestant		
2024	King of Masked Singer	Contestant (as Blowout Sale)	Episode 222; Eliminated in Round 2	

== Awards and nominations ==
Awards	Year	Category	Nominee / work	Result	Ref.
Korea Best Brand Awards	2024	Solo Vocal Popularity Award	Gyubin	Won	
