= White Day: A Labyrinth Named School (2015 video game) =

2015 survival horror video game

- North American PS4 cover
- Developers: ROI Games, Gachyon Soft
- Publishers: KOR: ROI Games; WW: ROI Games (Mobile); NA/EU: PQube
- Directors: Lee Won Sool; Lee Gyu-ho
- Producer: Lee Won Sool
- Engine: Unity
- Platforms: Android; iOS; Windows; PlayStation 4; PlayStation 5; Xbox One; Xbox Series X/S; Switch
- Release: Android: KOR: November 19, 2015; WW: May 2, 2018; iOS: WW: December 17, 2015; Windows: WW: August 22, 2017; PlayStation 4: KOR: August 21, 2017; EU: August 24, 2017; NA: August 29, 2017; PlayStation 5: WW: September 7, 2022; Switch, Xbox One, Xbox Series X/S: WW: September 8, 2022
- Genre: Survival horror
- Mode: Single-player

White Day: A Labyrinth Named School, (Note: Korean: 화이트데이: 학교라는 이름의 미궁; RR: Hwaiteudei: hakgyoraneun ireumui migung) known on mobile platforms internationally as White Day: The School, is a 2015 survival horror video game developed by ROI Games (also known as Sonnori) and Gachyon Soft. A remake of the 2001 game of the same name, it was initially released for Android in November 2015 in South Korea, and iOS on the following month. A port for Windows and PlayStation 4 was released in August 2017, published by ROI Games in Korea, PQube in North America and Europe, and Arc System Works in Japan.

Set in South Korea in 2001, players control Lee Hui-min, a new transfer student at a local high school who sneaks into the institution after hours to prepare a White Day surprise for his crush, Han So-young. Upon entry, Hui-min becomes trapped and begins to encounter the supernatural. With the assistance of other students, Hui-min traverses the building, hiding from foes and using item micro-management to solve puzzles to progress through the school, in an attempt to leave the building before dawn.

A sequel, White Day 2: The Flower That Tells Lies, was released in 2023.

== Gameplay ==
White Day: A Labyrinth Named School is a survival horror video game played from the first-person perspective. Players explore the school collecting items to solve puzzles and advance the story, much in the vein of a classic adventure game. Micro-management of items is key, as the player has limited item slots and some objects may be important for progression despite not being used for hours from the collection point. As the game offers non-linear progression, various documents can be found throughout the school offering additional backstory and hints on how to advance. Likewise, the player can receive text messages through their cell phone which offers clues on plot progression. Holding certain objects in specific sections of the game can trigger unique events and encounters, such as fights with ghosts that otherwise would not have been prompted. Puzzle solutions, such as combinations for locked safes, are randomized on each playthrough. This encompasses a large portion of the gameplay; searching for items and solving puzzles.

There are no weapons in the game, and thus the protagonist is unable to engage enemies in combat. Therefore, the player must hide from opponents, in a bid to stay alive. If damaged, healing items must be used to restore health, as the game does not feature health regeneration. If health is depleted completely, the player must return to a prior save. Saving can only be accomplished at bulletin boards scattered throughout the school with the use of felt-tip pens, which are limited and must be found around the academy, akin to ink ribbons from the original Resident Evil. Though other characters throughout the title are fully voiced, the protagonist is never heard, and instead communicates with other persons through the use of player-input dialogue options. Depending on what is said, conversations and in-game scenarios may change. The title features eight different endings, and the result achieved is dictated by these decisions made during conversations with story characters. Similarly, the difficulty selected when starting a new playthrough affects gameplay. Easier difficulties offer more items, progression hints and less paranormal encounters, whilst the harder ones include fewer items and hints, more difficult encounters, exclusive enemies and more frequent scares. On hard and above for example, the player's phone has no signal, thus eliminating the aforementioned text message clues.

== Synopsis ==
In South Korea, an observation known as White Day falls one month after Valentine's Day. In the region, women present men with chocolate on Valentine's Day, usually as an expression of affection, a reverse of the Western tradition which has boys offering gifts to girls. One month following Valentine's Day, on March 14, the men return the favour to the girls that gifted them chocolates, which is known as white day. The game takes place on the eve of White Day in 2001 and in South Korea, it follows protagonist Lee Hui-min, a newly transferred student who sneaks into his new high school, Yeondu High School, to leave his crush, Han So-young, some sweets and return her diary, which he found earlier that day on the school grounds. Upon entering the building, he becomes trapped inside the facility and encounters other students, including So-young. In his attempt to escape the school, Hui-min is tormented by ghosts and possessed human staff members of the school, and begins to uncover the dark past of the institution, learning about several paranormal events that occurred between 1998 and present day.

Most of the story throughout the game is revealed in collectible documents found throughout the school, and the plot varies depending on which choices the player makes throughout the adventure.

== Development and release ==

The graphical overhaul the team gave the original game can be seen in this comparison of antagonist Lee Bong-gu, pictured from the 2001 original (above) and the 2017 PlayStation 4 port.

The game's development began in March 2014. It began as a port of the original White Day for Android and iOS titled White Day: In Your Hands, with the port being handled by Korean developers Sonnori and Gachyon Soft. This port would have more accurately represented the original game from the 2009 mobile version, titled White Day Mobile — which was the first remake of White Day and was released only in South Korea by Ntreev Soft who shared the copyright — and where most of the original game's 3D graphics were replaced with 2D still images due to hardware limitations. As development continued, the team's additions to the original game, which included new story segments, improved graphics and cut content from the 2001 build led to the project being re-revealed as a remake in January 2015, with development being switched over to a new studio, ROI Games. Lee Won-Sool, the former CEO of Sonnori, who developed the original title, returned as director and producer of the remake.

On November 19 of that year, the completed Android game was released to the T-Store, Korea's equivalent to the Google Play Store, with the iOS version coming in the following weeks. A few months later, an English language version was made available for international markets, under the name The School: White Day. English language voice actors include Erica Schroeder, Sarah Natochenny, Jason Griffith, Tom Wayland and Kate Bristol, who collectively have played roles in the Sonic the Hedgehog and Pokémon franchises. All mobile versions were self-published by ROI Games.

At a November 2015 SCEK press conference in South Korea, it was announced that White Day would be releasing domestically on PlayStation 4 for the then upcoming PlayStation VR. However, on May 10, 2016, at SCEK's PlayStation Developer Conference 2016, the developers announced that it would be difficult to fit existing scenarios into VR play, so they announced a new VR title with changed scenarios, titled White Day: Swan Song. On April 18, 2016, a Steam Greenlight posting confirmed the existence of a PC version. Seven months later, during the annual South Korean trade show G-Star, it was announced that White Day would be releasing on PlayStation 4 as well as PC with new information about a new female character called Yoo Ji-Min and a new ending collection, with the release date being set for March 14, 2017. The release date would later be postponed in order for the game to have simultaneous worldwide release.

On May 3, 2017, it was announced via a post on the European PlayStation Blog that the title would be receiving an international publication in August, 2017, with British publisher PQube handling the translation and distribution in North America and Europe. Additionally, it was confirmed the game would remain a PlayStation-console exclusive. These new versions would feature improved graphics and audio, reworked mechanics, additional languages and the inclusion of the previously announced new story segments through character, Yoo Ji-min. PQube initially announced that the game would release across both platforms on August 1 in North America and August 4 in Europe, however a three-week delay to the worldwide Steam release caused the PlayStation version to be pushed back to August 22 in North America and August 25 in Europe, in a bid to have the two versions release simultaneously. The North American release was later pushed back a further week for undisclosed reasons. In Japan, a localization of the original mobile version was released on March 11, 2017. The PlayStation 4 edition was revealed to be published by Arc System Works, of Blazblue and Guilty Gear fame. As a nod to this, pre-orders in the region includes access to costumes from the Blazblue series. Unlike in other territories, the Japanese version has characters renamed and designed with Japanese names and school uniforms, in order to have the title replicate a Japanese setting.

Physical copies for the PlayStation 4 were made available through various online retailers in the United Kingdom, while limited to Amazon.com and videogamesplus.ca in the United States and Canada, respectively. Those who pre-ordered the title in Canada and the British retailer GAME received a complementary soundtrack CD. White Day launched at a budgeted price of £29.99 in the UK, USD$29.99 in the United States, CAD$39.99 in Canada, ¥4800 in Japan and ₩32000 in South Korea.

As of September 3, 2017, two patches have been released for the PlayStation 4 and Windows version of the game. These updates corrected balancing issues with the in-game janitors (which most critics had cited as too difficult) and various other technical fixes. An enhanced version with over 30 costumes originally released as downloadable content was released for Nintendo Switch, PlayStation 5, Xbox One, and Xbox Series X/S on September 8, 2022.

== Reception ==
Reception

Aggregate score
Aggregator	Score
Metacritic	PS4: 67/100; NS: 63/100

Review score
Publication	Score
Destructoid	6.5/10 (PS4)

White Day: A Labyrinth Named School received mixed reviews from critics on PlayStation 4 and Nintendo Switch according to aggregate review website Metacritic.Praise was generally given to the setting, puzzles, and horror aspects. Reviewers also favourably compared the title to classic horror games from the PlayStation 2 era. Conversely, criticism was given to the difficulty and frequency of the janitors and ghosts that appeared throughout the game, which critics said were too overpowered and hindered exploration (the former of which later received a patch that reduced difficulty). The cryptic nature of certain boss battles was also cited as an issue.

Cory Arnold of Destructoid, in a review of the PlayStation 4 version, praised the title's sound direction and clever puzzles, as well as the ghost encounters, calling them the best part of the adventure. However, Arnold echoed many other critics in his criticism of the janitors' difficulty level, while also knocking the character interactions and overall story. He concluded his review by scoring the game a 6.5/10.

== Sequel ==
A sequel, White Day 2: The Flower That Tells Lies (Note: Korean: 화이트데이 2: 거짓말을 하는 꽃; RR: Hwaiteudei 2: geojinmareul haneun kkot) was announced on 16 January 2023 by Rootn Studio. It was released in 2023 for Windows, before being released the following year for both PlayStation 5 and Xbox Series X/S. The last episode was released on 21 July 2023.
