= Shin Ji =

South Korean musician (born 1981)

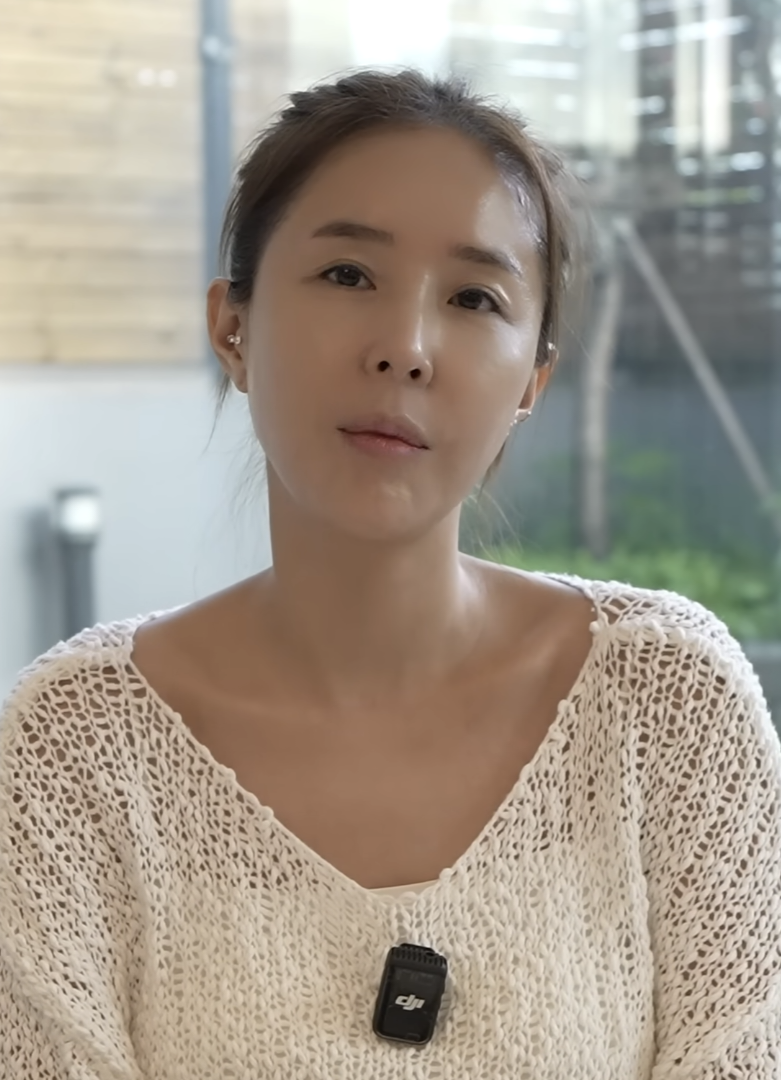
- Shin in 2025
- Born: Lee Ji-seon; 18 November 1981 (age 44); Incheon, South Korea
- Occupations: Singer; lyricist; actress
- Spouse: MoonOne (m. 2026)
- Musical career
- Genre: K-pop
- Instrument: Vocals
- Member of: Koyote

Korean name
- Hangul: 이지선
- RR: I Jiseon
- MR: I Chisŏn

Stage name
- Hangul: 신지
- RR: Sin Ji
- MR: Sin Chi

Lee Ji-seon (Korean: 이지선; 18 November 1981), known professionally as Shin Ji (Korean: 신지), is a South Korean singer, lyricist and actress. She attended Dongduk Women's University – Department of Popular Music. She made her debut in 1998 in the group, Koyote, and wrote lyrics for some of the group's songs including "I Love Rock & Roll". She is the only female and original member of the group.

== Personal life ==
On June 23, 2025, it was announced that Shin would marry singer MoonOne in 2026. The couple married on May 2, 2026 in Gangnam District, Seoul.

== Discography ==
=== Studio albums ===
Title	Album details	Peak chart positions	Sales
Title	Album details	KOR	Sales
Shin Ji	Released: 17 July 2008; Label: T Entertainment; Format: CD	20	KOR: 5,775

=== Singles ===
Title	Year	Peak chart positions	Album
Title	Year	KOR	Album
"Breaking Up Is Hard To Do" (이별이 안부를 묻다) narrated by Cha Tae-hyun	2008	No data	Shin Ji
"Sunny Day" (해뜰날) feat. Mighty Mouth	2008	No data	Shin Ji
"Hero" (주인공) with Solbi	2009	No data	The Shinbi
"Looking For Love" (사랑을 찾아서) with Woo Jae of Typhoon	2010	76	Non-album singles
"In This Shape..." (이 모양 이 꼴로...)	2010	33	Non-album singles
"Because A Woman Cries" (여자를 울렸으니까)	2011	41	Non-album singles
"Late Regret" (늦은 후회)	2015	—	Non-album singles
"My Heart Is Racing" (#두근두근)	2015	—	Non-album singles
"How Long Time..." (얼마나 더...) with NC.A	2015	—	Time To Be A Woman
"Good Girl" (착한여자)	2018	—	Non-album singles
"Don't Try" (애쓰지 말아요)	2019	—	Non-album singles
"Feel So Good" (느낌이 좋아)	2019	—	Non-album singles
"Forget" (세 번 잊어요)	2020	—	Non-album singles
"Always"	2021	—	Non-album singles
"Me to You" (나를 너에게)	2021	—	Non-album singles
"—" denotes release did not chart.

=== Soundtrack appearances ===
Title	Year	Album
"Me to You" (나를 너에게)	2003	One Piece OST
"Always"	2005	Yogurting OST
"You & I"	2006	Famous Chil Princesses OST
"Can't Even Sleep" (잠도 못자요)	2009	Smile, You OST
"Step By Step" (한걸음씩)	2010	Giant OST
"Can You See?" (보이나요)	2014	Aftermath OST
"Sad Dream" (비몽) with Won Ju-hui	2016	Fantastic Duo Part 18 OST
"I Will" (난)	2018	Secrets and Lies OST
"Sweep Sweep"	2020	Gaduri Restaurant OST

== Filmography ==
=== Television series ===
Year	Title	Role	Notes	Ref.
2006–2007	High Kick!	Shin Ji		
2009–2010	High Kick Through the Roof	Shin Ji	Cameo (ep.81)	

=== Television shows ===
Year	Title	Role	Notes	Ref.
2018	Real Man 300	Main Cast		
2019	King of Mask Singer	Contestant	episode 221–222	
2020	Mr Trot	Judge		
2020	Between Question and Music	Main Cast		
2020–2021	Miss Trot S2	Judge		
2020	Top 10 Student	Panel		
2021–2022	Tomorrow's National Singer	Judge		
2023	Show King Night	Judge		

=== Radio shows ===
Year	Title	Role	Notes	Ref.
2021–present	Single Show	DJ	with Jeong Jun-ha	

=== Web shows ===
Year	Title	Role	Notes	Ref.
2022	Idol Hit Song Festival	Host	with Kim Jong-min	

== Awards and nominations ==
Name of the award ceremony, year presented, category, nominee of the award, and the result of the nomination
Award ceremony	Year	Category	Nominee / Work	Result	Ref.
MBC Entertainment Awards	2021	Rookie of the Year in Radio	Jung Jun-ha and Shinji's Single Smile Show	Won	
