= Alteil =

- Logo for the Alteil
- Developer: Dex Entertainment Inc.
- Publisher: Apocoplay LLC; Media Blasters Interactive
- Platform: Adobe Flash Player
- Release: JP: 2004; NA: 2008
- Genre: Card game
- Mode: Multiplayer

A playing card from the game

Alteil (アルテイル, Aruteiru) was a story-driven, Flash-based online collectible card game produced by Japanese studio Dex Entertainment and published by Media Blasters. It was released in Japan in 2004, and released in English in 2008. Alteil claims to be the most popular online card game in its home country). The images on the online cards were designed by a team of Japanese fantasy artists, and the playing style is different from many other traditional card games. The game is no longer managed by Dex Entertainment, but is currently managed by GP Core Edge (a subsidiary of Gamepot). Recently, this game has been re-released to North America by the company Apocoplay as of October 6, 2012. In North America, Alteil shutdown and was replaced with Alteil: Horizons which shutdown in 2017 and was replaced by the mobile game Alteil NEO which shutdown November 30th, 2019.

Besides the main game, Alteil also contains three minigames: Lavato Hero's (ラヴァートヒーローズ, Ravāto Hīrōzu), Napoleon (ナポレオン～ラヴァート大決戦～, Naporeon ~Ravāto Daikessen~), and Mirage Master (ミラージュマスター, Mirāju Masutā). Only Mirage Master is currently available in the English version.

== Gameplay ==
A game of Alteil usually lasts between fifteen and twenty minutes. Since the internet allows players to use virtual gameplay techniques, players are able to do things which they couldn't do using physical cards. For instance, players can have the same card from their deck in multiple files (files are groupings of cards that are used in a match), choose cards to use from the entire deck rather than drawing cards from the deck and using them a hand, and complex mathematics can be implemented without disrupting the pace of the game. Players in the game are referred to as Iczers (イクサー, Ikusā).

=== Cards ===
The cards are separated into four element like groups called Spheres of Influence. These spheres are individually called: Refess (リフェス, Rifesu), Lawtia (ローティア, Rōtia), Gowen (ゴウエン, Gouen), and Falkow (ファルカウ, Farukau). Cards of a sphere typically have similar strengths and weaknesses.

== Reception ==
Inventor Spot states: "Alteil takes up where these games leave off, adding exquisite anime style artwork and an online dimension few RPGs can match!"

Nate Ming at Crunchyroll praised the "smartly-designed system and beautiful card art."
