= Trickster Online =

2003 video game

- Developer: Ntreev Soft
- Publishers: Gamepot, Gamigo, ChineseGamer, Netmarble, ValofeThai and Smilegate
- Platform: Microsoft Windows
- Release: KOR: April 10, 2003; JP: 2005; CN: 2005; TH: 2006; TW: 2007; NA: February 23, 2007
- Genre: Fantasy MMORPG
- Mode: Multiplayer

Trickster Online was a free, 2D isometric MMORPG developed by the Korean company Ntreev Soft.

As of January 28, 2014, all official Trickster Online servers have shut down.

On July 1, 2020, a trailer was released for Trickster:M, a new mobile MMORPG.

== Story ==
The characters compete in a "contest" to win treasure on an island organized by the late Don Cavalier. The story as a whole is heavily influenced by Greek mythology. Each section of the plot is split up into 6 episodes each unraveling a portion of the final story, which ends up being more than just a "treasure hunt".

== Gameplay ==
Trickster Online is graphically an anime-inspired MMORPG. Gameplay in Trickster is mostly click-and-fire based; movement, combat, and many other commands are all controlled by mouse. Gameplay also includes a few non-combat "systems". First, there is the Drill System, in which a player drills in certain types of terrain for items and EXP. Second, there is the Card Battling System, which sets two characters against each other in a game of cards, played with card items found by various means during normal gameplay. The game is currently released under all its versions as a free-to-play MMORPG but with a Cash Shop feature, also known in game as MyShop, that allows purchase of in-game items through real cash/credit charging.

== Leveling Up ==
There are two leveling systems: base leveling and TM leveling. Base leveling percentage is shown at the very top of the screen as a long yellow bar. When one levels up, they attain four points that they can allocate into 12 different stats (see below) in the "MyView" window. Base level is not only important for becoming more skilled in the 12 different stats but also in acquiring more powerful items. TM level percentage is displayed near the top of the "Skills" window and under the base leveling bar (as the green bar). When one levels up in this system, they get one point that they can allocate into a skill, learn a skill with, master a skill, or simply save for later.

== Characters ==
There are 4 classes of characters differentiated by their primary statistics. These classes are then divided into 9 playable characters, 3 under power and 2 under the rest of each other type. Each character is associated with an animal and a profession, the former being reflected by a set of ears and a tail that are equipped by default on character creation. Male and female characters of the same type will have skills that are exactly alike. However, after the second advancement, the skills of the male and female character will branch off and differ from one another; finally, at the third advancement, the character may choose to focus on the type's skillset ('pure') or branch out ('hybrid')

- Power Type: This type of character focuses on physical combat. It includes Bunny (female), Polar Bear (female) and Buffalo (male) characters. On the second advancement, the Bunny will become a Boxer and will have skills that do focused damage on one target. The Buffalo will advance to the Warrior and focus on doing damage to multiple targets at once. The Polar Bear will advance into a Veterinarian that has skills focused on crazy drilling. For the third job, the Boxer may become a Champion or Duelist; the Buffalo may become a Gladiator or Mercenary; the Polar Bear will become a Zoologist
- Magic Type: This type of character focuses on casting spells, both for combat and recovery. It includes Sheep (female) and Dragon (male) characters. On the second advancement, the Sheep will become a Bard and have access to elemental spells. The Dragon will become a Magician and will obtain magic spells that deal light or dark-based damage. The Sheep may further advance to become a Soul Master or Witch; the Dragon may become a Dark Lord, Priest or Wizard who focuses on dark, light and balanced attacks respectively.
- Sense Type: This type of character uses long-range attacks, as well as having bonuses with drilling, and use guns. It includes Fox (female) and Lion (male) characters. On the second advancement, The Fox will become an Explorer, being able to throw certain items from afar and have skills which enable even more drilling bonuses. The Lion becomes an Inventor, who will have mostly skills associated with guns. For the third job, the Fox may become a Thief Master or Hunter Lord; the Lion may become a Scientist or Cyber Hunter.
- Charm Type: This type of character gets special bonuses to evasion and defense. It includes Cat (female) and Raccoon (male) characters. The Cat will become an Entertainer after the second advancement, being even more specialized with skills that increase her endurance. The Raccoon will become a Card Master, and have several skills that deal damage with cards and others that help with evasion after the advancement. For the third job, the Cat may become a Primadonna or Diva; the Raccoon may become a Gambler or Duke.

== Stats ==
Character statistics and attributes in Trickster can be viewed through the "MyView" window during normal game play. There are a total of 13 different attributes that are grouped, 3 each, under the 4 broader headings of Power, Magic, Sense and Charm. Each attribute is assigned a level, indicating the proficiency of the character in that particular attribute. To gain a level in an attribute, the 4 "pips" under the respective attribute must be filled, only after which will players will see an increase in the value for that attribute.

== Skills ==
When TM levels up they can use the point earned in one of the skills bought. To buy a skill, the player must go to a skill shrine to buy a skill card from a skill master. There is one skill master for each of the four classes. Once a player has bought a skill card, they must use the card so that it may be learned. TM points must be used to learn the skill initially, and the person's TM level must also be high enough to learn the skill. Once a skill reaches a certain level by putting TM points into it, the skill can be mastered for it to be any further improved, This is also the final improvement and provides a more powerful boost to the skill than any other improvement. To master a skill, the player must go to a skill master who will then tell how much of an item the player needs to get, along with how many TM points needed to master the skill. When the player reaches base level 50, TM level 40, they can be promoted to the second job where they can access more skills. There are different skill builds for different characters on various websites.

== Release ==
Server	Publisher	Release date	Closure date	Server Status
South Korea	Ntreev Soft	April 10, 2003	January 18, 2014	Closed
Japan	Ntreev Soft	2005	January 28, 2014	Closed
China	Ntreev Soft	2005	2014	Closed
Taiwan	Ntreev Soft	2006	2014	Closed
Thailand	Ntreev Soft	2007	January 8, 2014	Closed
North America	Ntreev Soft	February 23, 2007	February 27, 2013	Closed

== Sequel ==
A mobile-exclusive sequel, Trickster M, was developed by Ntreev Soft and published by NCSoft. It was released on 20 May 2021 for Android and iOS. The game was designed with MMORPG elements inspired by NCSoft's Lineage mobile games.

Trickster M was considered a commercial failure. While the game gathered over 300,000 concurrent players on the launch day, the number dropped drastically over time. On 11 July 2021, there were only 8001 concurrent players in the server, a 97% decrease from the launch two months ago. By December 2023, the number dropped further to 375 players. Ntreev Soft was shut down in 2024 by NCSoft, citing its chronic financial issues for the closure, with a ₩60,000,000,000 accumulated deficit at the time. The game's online service was terminated on 13 March 2024.
