= Gamepot =

Japanese video game company

GMO Gamepot, Inc.
- Type: Subsidiary
- Industry: Online games
- Founded: May 17, 2001
- Defunct: December 1, 2017
- Fate: Absorbed by GMO Internet
- Headquarters: Tokyo, Japan
- Products: Online games
- Owner: GMO Internet
- Website: company.gamepot.co.jp

GMO Gamepot, Inc. (GMOゲームポット株式会社, GMO Gēmupotto Kabushiki-gaisha) was one of Japan's leading game publishers of massively multiplayer online games and mobile games.

== History ==
GMO Gamepot was founded in 2001 as Gamepot Co., Ltd. (株式会社ゲームポット, Kabushiki-gaisha Gēmupotto). It was acquired by Aeria in March 2003 and had its first success with an online golf game called Pangya in 2004. Gamepot opened an American publishing division, Gamepot USA, Inc., in Los Angeles in August 2008.

In 2006, Gamepot successfully launched Kunshu (The Monarch Online), Cabal Online, and La Tale. In 2008, Gamepot merged with Wizardry owner Aeria IPM. Also, Gamepot (USA) partnered with Square Enix in the English localization of Fantasy Earth Zero in 2010 and created Wizardry Online in 2013. Gamepot was acquired by GMO Internet in November 2013 and its name was changed to GMO Gamepot on January 1, 2014.

Alteil, a story-driven, Flash-based online collectible card game produced by Dex Entertainment and published by Media Blasters, is now managed by Gamepot.

GMO Gamepot closed on December 1, 2017 and was absorbed by GMO Internet.

== Games ==
=== Japanese division ===
==== Online games ====
- Wizardry Online (January 30, 2013)
- Mebius Online (April 6, 2011~February 28, 2013)
- Paperman (February 12, 2009~December 26, 2016)
- Concerto Gate (April 23, 2009~)
- La Tale (2007~)
- Fantasy Earth Zero (December 2006~September 2022)
- CABAL Online (November 2006~)
- Kunshu Online
- Pangya (November 11, 2004~)
- Web Koihime Muso
- The Shogun
- Lively Island COR
- Trickster Online (Transfer 2012~)

=== U.S. division ===
- The Legend of MIR 2 (Canceled)
- Bright Shadow (Canceled)
- Fantasy Earth Zero (Canceled)
- Alteil (Canceled)

=== Global division ===
- Captain Tsubasa Zero Kimero!-Miracle Shot
