= GolfStar =

- Developer(s): Com2Us
- Publisher(s): gamigo AG
- Platform(s): Windows, IOS, Android
- Genre(s): Sports, MMORPG
- Mode(s): Single-player, multiplayer

GolfStar is a massively multiplayer online golf video game which features character development and MMORPG elements. It is developed by the South Korean game developer Com2Us. The English-language Microsoft Windows version is published by German game publisher gamigo AG. An alternate version for iOS and Android also exists, self-published by Com2Us. Although there is no subscription fee or cost to download and play the game, the game offers "Star" and "Star Premium" membership plans for a monthly fee. Additional in-game items may also be purchased with real currency.

On January 14, 2014, gamigo AG announced that Com2Us was discontinuing support for the English language PC version of GolfStar. The English PC version was shut down on February 24, 2014 (while mobile versions and the Korean language PC version still remain active).

== Publishing ==
The US and European PC version of GolfStar is published by gamigo AG, and has support for English and German languages. The US and European IOS/Android version is self-published by Com2Us.

== Gameplay (PC version) ==
The game allows players to compete together on several fictional and non-fictional courses in various modes of play. Modes vary from golf simulator staples such as stroke and match play, as well as more original modes such as skins match (in which players bet on each hole) and competition or team competition modes (which allow up to 30 players to compete on a course in real time, in order to speed up the gameplay).

For each hole completed, the player earns both experience points and in-game currency called GP ("gamigo Points"). When the player accumulates enough experience points, their character will advance to the next level. By advancing levels, players receive AP (Ability Points) to improve their characters' stats (power, impact, control, and stamina), and eventually gain access to new items (clubs, clothing etc.). Players also accumulate Skill Points, which are used to learn new special skills and shots that allow players to fine-tune their stroke in various situations (such as the "Draw Shot", which adds more left sidespin to a shot, or the "Fried Egg Shot", which reliably hits a ball out of a bunker).

GP can be used to purchase items such as clubs and clothing, as well as support items – such as "capsules" which are used during a round to replenish stamina points (HP) or intelligence points (MP, which depletes when skills are used). Clubs and clothing can also be "fitted" (which improves their overall stats) or "cloned" (which transfers the stat points from one item of clothing to another), A premium currency called Star Points also exists (purchasable with real currency), which can be used to purchase a much wider selection of fashion, clubs, and miscellaneous items and features. The game uses an "item rental" system – in which most items that are acquired or purchased (with in-game or real world currency) expire after a period of time (30, 60, 90 days, etc.), but can be renewed by purchasing "Renewal Tickets" (or "Star Renewal Tickets" for premium items).

GolfStar classifies players as Beginner, Junior, Amateur, Semi-Pro, Pro, or National. After achieving the required level, players are allowed to take a qualifying test which allows them to rank-up upon passing, granting them access to higher-tiered items and clubs. Seasonal tournaments are also available each with specific rank and level limitations (the Rookie-Tour, AMA-Tour, SEMI-Tour, and the gPGU-Tour); with the top players in each tour being awarded prizes upon the tours' completion.

6 base characters are available. (2 character types are only able to purchased with Star Points). The basic character types are Patrick, Althea, Bert, and Zoe. The two Premium characters are David and Eve. (Premium characters have advantages, such as additional starting ability (stat) points, and faster XP gain rate).

=== Courses ===
There are a wide variety of courses based on real-world locations (such as TPC Sawgrass) and fictional designs (such as Kyoto, Sands Ocean and Safari). Playing them provides varying bonuses and experience points depending on the difficulty. The course feature variable weather conditions, including temperature, humidity, wind, rain, and even snow. Each course also has an "easy" and a "hard" mode available (playing on hard mode causes more unpredictable and extreme weather conditions)

== See also ==
- Shot Online
- Pangya
