= Princess Connect! Re:Dive =

Japanese media franchise

- Princess Connect! Re:Dive logo

プリンセスコネクト！Re:Dive (Purinsesu Konekuto! Ridaibu)
- Video game
- Developer: Cygames
- Publisher: JP: Cygames; TW/HK/MAC: So-net; CHN: Bilibili; KR: Kakao Games, Nexon; TH: Ini3 Digital; WW: Crunchyroll Games
- Produced by: Yuito Kimura
- Music by: Kohei Tanaka
- Genre: Role-playing; Science fantasy
- Platform: Android, iOS, Windows
- Released: Android, iOS: JP: February 15, 2018; TW/HK/MAC: August 1, 2018; KR: March 28, 2019; CHN: April 17, 2020; TH: September 18, 2020; WW: January 19, 2021; Microsoft Windows: JP: May 22, 2018
- Manga
- Written by: Asahiro Kakashi
- Illustrated by: wEshica/Shougo
- Published by: Kodansha
- Magazine: Cycomics
- Original run: February 18, 2018 – December 23, 2018
- Volumes: 2
- Anime television series
- Directed by: Takaomi Kanasaki (Note: Credited as Chief Director (総監督, Sō Kantoku) for the second season.); Yasuo Iwamoto (season 2)
- Written by: Takaomi Kanasaki
- Music by: Imagine (Note: Akifumi Tada, Yasunori Nishiki, Shingo Nishimura, Kenta Higashiohji, Tsubasa Ito, Akihiro Honda, Yuki Shirai, Ryuta Kakiuchi)
- Studio: CygamesPictures
- Licensed by: Crunchyroll
- Original network: Tokyo MX, BS11, SUN, KBS Kyoto
- Original run: April 7, 2020 – March 29, 2022
- Episodes: 25
- icon

Princess Connect! Re:Dive (Japanese: プリンセスコネクト！Re:Dive, Hepburn: Purinsesu Konekuto! Ridaibu) is a Japanese science fantasy role-playing video game developed by Cygames. It was released in Japan on February 15, 2018, for Android and iOS, and on May 22, 2018, for Microsoft Windows via DMM Games. Mobile version would later be released in other regions.

The game was announced in August 2016 as a sequel to the social network game Princess Connect! (abbreviated as プリコネ, Prikone), which was released on February 18, 2015, and ended service in June 2016.

The game was co-developed by CyberAgent and Ameba Business Division (Girl Friend Beta) and Cygames (Rage of Bahamut and Granblue Fantasy), by utilizing the strengths of both companies. It is a dating sim game that incorporates online RPG elements such as guild battles.

An anime television series adaptation produced by CygamesPictures aired from April to June 2020. A second season aired from January to March 2022.

On March 30, 2023, Crunchyroll, the publisher for the global version of the game, announced that the game would be ending service on April 30.

== Gameplay ==
Princess Connect! Re:Dive is a real-time action role-playing game. Players can form a party of up to five characters to participate in various modes such as main quests and player versus player (PvP) arena modes. New characters can be obtained via a gacha mechanic or can be exchanged with character-specific Memory Pieces (the latter is not possible for event-exclusive characters). Players are also able to form clans to qualify for participation in Clan Battles, which are similar to raid battles in a typical massively multiplayer online role-playing game, or freely chat with one another using text or in-game emojis in the clan room.

Every playable character in the game has a regular attack, two Skills, an EX Skill, and one Union Burst. Players generally have no control over the activation of characters' skills and attacks, which are automatically activated at predetermined times based on character. EX Skills are stat-gaining skills that are activated on the start of each battle. A Union Burst is a powerful skill which, unlike other skills, can be manually activated by the player at any time the character's Union Burst Meter (also known as TP in-game) is full. However, all PvP arena modes are strictly on autoplay, where the character's Union Burst is activated as soon as their TP is fully charged.

== Story ==
=== Setting ===
The game takes place in the year 2033 in a virtual reality video game titled Legend of Astrum, a fantasy action role-playing game populated by various races including humans, "beastfolk" (humanoids possessing animal traits) among others, where thousands of people who "dived" (logged in) were trapped with no means to log out in an incident later known as "Minerva's Imprisonment (ミネルヴァの懲役, Mineruva no Chōeki)". The protagonist is a player named Yuuki, who serves as a Princess Knight, a retainer to one of Legend of Astrum's chief developers, the Seven Crowns, who goes on a journey across Legend of Astrum's eponymous landmass.

=== Plot ===
The Twinkle Wish guild, Hiyori, Rei and Yui, had ascended the Tower of Sol, encounter Mana Senri, titled Kaiser Insight, who merged with the game world's AI administrator Minerva. After she knocks out Hiyori and Rei, a severely injured Yuuki shields Yui as he is engulfed from Mana's attack. Yuuki awakens in an unknown location and meets guide fairy Ameth, who seems to be familiar with him. With no time, she sends him down to Landsol where he is given a vague mission that he must complete.

Upon awakening, Yuuki has lost all memory. He is met by Kokkoro, a girl assigned by Ameth to be his guide on his adventures. Shortly afterwards he meets a swordswoman with a voracious appetite, whom the duo nickname Pecorine, and later a cat beast-woman, Karyl. The group founds the Gourmet Guild (美食殿, Bishokuden) with the goal of going on adventures while eating the food that Landsol has to offer.

After Pecorine defeats Mana and reclaims her right to the throne of Landosol, the group return to the Tower of Sol in search of a way back to reality and prevent Eris, a mysterious woman resembling Yui, from resetting the world. Eris reveals she was generated to grant Yui's wish to become Princess after she previously escaped from Mana on the tower, and fused with Minerva, whom Mana manipulated into granting their wish, triggering a server lockdown known as "Minerva's Imprisonment". After resummoning Minerva, Sheffy, one of Eris' avatars, sacrifices herself to lift the Imprisonment and allowing the remaining players with Labyrista's code to freely return to the real world.

In the legendary creature-populated Reverse World (裏世界, Urasekai), consisting of three nations: Geo Teogonia, Geo Gehenna and Geo Niflhell, Yuuki learns the existence of other Royal Equipment (王家の装備, Ōke no Sōbi) holders besides Pecorine who wield powers based on the seven deadly sins, three of which are the Reverse World's respective Princesses, and encounters Vision Empress, the dragon creator of Astrum who is bent on rewriting the Earth into her living quarters, and her three Knights who also carry Royal Equipment. Minerva and Tia, another guide fairy, grant Yuuki a wish to nominate a Princess (or choose not to), resetting the world, allowing him to escape and defeat Vision Empress.

During Astrum's maintenance after Vision Empress' defeat, Yuuki and the others are summoned back after a cry for help by Aglaia, one of the Five Great Spirits, to rescue fellow Spirit Aeolus. They discover that Astrum is being remodeled into a battle royale first-person shooter. After Aeolus is rescued, Yuuki begins a quest to defeat the Star Beast Princess.

== Development ==
As Cygames was in charge of Princess Connect! Character productions and the project started with the desire to make a sequel using these characters after obtaining permission. Since there was time during the update for the final story of Princess Connect!, it was decided to make Pecorine the lead role in the sequel Princess Connect! Re:Dive and to make an appearance in the ending of Princess Connect!.

It was developed as an anime RPG that consists of two parts animation and game. Care was taken not to separate these two elements during the UI design and visuals adjustments. The main story animations are produced by WIT STUDIO. While the ending of the limited-time event and others are produced by CygamesPictures.

On 21 August 2016, the game was announced at the Cygames NEXT 2016 new game presentation.

== Albums ==
COCC-17361 PRICONNE CHARACTER SONG 01
| No. | Title | Vocals | Composer | Arrangement | Lyrics | Length |
|---|---|---|---|---|---|---|
| 01 | Lost Princess Princess Connect! Re:Dive Act 1 Main Theme Anime Opening Theme | Pecorine (CV: M·A·O) Kokkoro (CV: Miku Ito) Karyl (CV: Rika Tachibana) | Kohei Tanaka | Takayuki Negishi | Shihori | 4:43 |
| 02 | つなぐもの Princess Connect! Act 2 Main Theme | Yui (CV: Risa Taneda) Hiyori (CV: Nao Toyama) Rei (CV: Saori Hayami) | Takayuki Tonegawa Kazuya Saka | Dr.Usui Kazuya Saka Wicky.Recordings | Takayuki Tonegawa | 4:13 |
| オリジナルドラマ (Original Drama) | | Characters | | | | |
| 03 | 「雨のち笑顔、ときどき空腹」(Ame Nochi Egao, Tokidoki Kūfuku) | Pecorine (CV: M·A·O) Kokkoro (CV: Miku Ito) Karyl (CV: Rika Tachibana) | Yui (CV: Risa Taneda) Hiyori (CV: Nao Toyama) Rei (CV: Saori Hayami) | | | 23:24 |

COCC-17362 PRICONNE CHARACTER SONG 02
| No. | Title | Vocals | Composer | Arrangement | Lyrics | Length |
|---|---|---|---|---|---|---|
| 01 | Connecting Happy!! Ending Theme Song Web Radio Theme Song | Pecorine (CV: M·A·O) Kokkoro (CV: Miku Ito) Karyl (CV: Rika Tachibana) | Sonosuke Takao (F.M.F) | Yuki Nara (F.M.F) | Aki Hata | 3:56 |
| 02 | えがおのマイホーム (Egao no My Home) Insert Song, Event ED | Saren (CV: Yui Horie) Suzume (CV: Aoi Yuki) | Lucas (TRYTONELABO) | Lucas (TRYTONELABO) | Mitsu (TRYTONELABO) | 4:04 |
| オリジナルドラマ (Original Drama) | | Characters | | | | |
| 03 | 「愛する貴女のお気に召すまま」(Aisuru Kijou no Okinimesu Mama) オリジナルドラマ (Original Drama) | Pecorine (CV: M·A·O) Kokkoro (CV: Miku Ito) Karyl (CV: Rika Tachibana) | Saren (CV: Yui Horie) Suzume (CV: Aoi Yuki) | | | 20:15 |

COCC-17673 PRICONNE CHARACTER SONG 13
| No. | Title | Vocals | Composer | Arrangement | Lyrics | Length |
|---|---|---|---|---|---|---|
| 01 | Mirage Game Ending Theme Song Web Radio Theme Song | Pecorine (CV: M·A·O) Kokkoro (CV: Miku Ito) Karyl (CV: Rika Tachibana) Yui (CV: Risa Taneda) Hiyori (CV: Nao Toyama) Rei (CV: Saori Hayami) Sheffy (CV: Reina Kondo) | Kohei Tanaka | Yuki Nara (F.M.F) | Aki Hata | 3:56 |
| 02 | Yes! Precious Harmony! | Saren (CV: Yui Horie) Suzume (CV: Aoi Yuki) | Lucas (TRYTONELABO) | Lucas (TRYTONELABO) | Mitsu (TRYTONELABO) | 4:04 |

Absolute Secret

- Vocals: Karyl (CV: Rika Tachibana)
- Composer: Naozumi Mabuchi
- Arranger: Naozumi Mabuchi
- Lyricist: corochi (Cygames)

Ending theme for chapter 8

== Media ==
=== Manga ===
A manga adaptation, written by Asahiro Kakashi and illustrated by wEshica/Shōgo, has been serialized online via Cygames' manga app Cycomics. Kodansha have published two tankōbon volumes as of February 2019. A comic anthology featuring various artists was released on May 27, 2019.

=== Anime ===
An anime television series adaptation by CygamesPictures aired from April 7 to June 30, 2020. The series premiered in Japan on Tokyo MX, BS11, Sun TV, and KBS Kyoto before airing on other channels. Crunchyroll streamed the series. The series was directed by Takaomi Kanasaki with assistant directing by Kana Harufuji. Satomi Kurita, Lie Jun Yang and Yasuyuki Noda provided character designs.

On August 13, 2020, it was announced that the series will receive a second season, with CygamesPictures returning for production. It is directed by Yasuo Iwamoto, with Kanasaki serving as the chief director and scriptwriter. Mai Watanabe joins Kurita, Yang, and Noda to provide character designs, and Imagine is composing the series' music. The main cast will reprise their roles. The second season aired from January 11 to March 29, 2022.

=== Video games ===
PriConne: Grand Masters was available from 1 to 8 April 2022 as an April Fools' limited Auto Chess type game.

Several Princess Connect! Re:Dive characters featured in a collaboration event for the role-playing game Granblue Fantasy between December 9 and December 21, 2018. Pecorine and Kokkoro are both playable characters while Kyaru and the player character appear in the story. The event was reintroduced permanently in 2019 with Kyaru also being made playable.

On November 5, 2020, it was announced that Pecorine would be featured in a collaboration event for Dragalia Lost.

=== Web novel ===
Princess Connect! - Princess Knight Sodatsusen (Japanese: プリンセスコネクト！ 〜プリンセスナイト争奪戦〜) was a web novel of the prequel game Princess Connect! was released on Dengeki Online. Author by Ōta Riyō with the supervision of and co-produced by CyberAgent / Cygames.
