= Wizardry Online =

2013 video game

- Developer: Gamepot
- Publisher: Sony Online Entertainment
- Director: Kenji Tokita
- Producers: Keishi Iwahara; Oliver Smith; Jose Araiza
- Composers: Akimasa Shibata; Maki Kirioka; Shunsuke Tsuchiya; Natsumi Kameoka
- Series: Wizardry
- Platform: Microsoft Windows
- Release: 30 January 2013
- Genre: MMORPG

Wizardry Online was a free-to-play MMORPG developed by Gamepot, Inc, based on the classic Wizardry computer games originally created by Sir-Tech. It was released in January 2013 before being discontinued in July 2014.

== Gameplay ==
Like many MMORPGs, players could create their own characters and explore and advance in an open world with other players that are also connected. A more dangerous addition to the gameplay was the potential for permanent death. The chance of losing your character can be reduced by sacrificing items.

Wizardry Online features five races as well as four classes. Similar to previous Wizardry games, a new character would receive bonus points they can assign to attributes. Each class has a requirement for a number of points in a one or more attributes in order to select that class. Open world player versus player (PvP) was also featured in the game. Player characters that have been killed could be looted of their belongings by other players. Wizardry Online used microtransactions to support itself. There was also a limited selection of items available for in-game gold.

== Release ==
In October 2011, an open beta was launched in Japan. In June 2012, Sony Online Entertainment announced that it would publish Wizardry Online outside Japan. The game was released in the United States and Europe on 30 January 2013. The game's servers were shut down on 31 July 2014.

== Reception ==
Reception

Aggregate score
Aggregator	Score
Metacritic	59/100

Wizardry Online received mostly mixed reviews. GameSpot praised the game's interesting combat system and use of permadeath, but criticized the graphics and user interface.
