= Ini3 Digital =

Online game service provide in Thailand

Ini3 Digital PLC
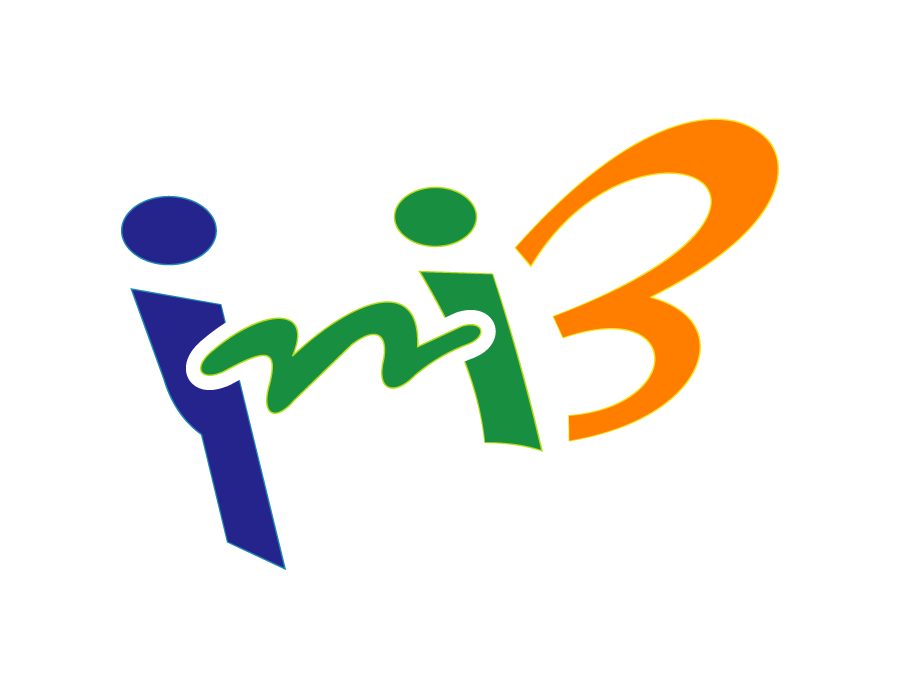
- Company type: Public company
- Industry: Entertainment, Publishing
- Founded: 2004
- Headquarters: 149 Galaxy Place Building 8th Floor, Room 8/1-8/2 Nonsee Road, Chongnonsee, Yannawa, Bangkok 10120, Thailand
- Number of employees: 0
- Website: https://www.ini3.co.th

Ini3 Digital is an online game service provider based in Thailand. Established in 2004, it is the first Thai company to utilize the Free-to-play model and the first to import Web-browser based games into the Thai game industry.

In 2005, Ini3 Digital started servicing Fly for Fun, a.k.a. Flyff, developed by Aeon Soft from South Korea. The slogan used for the game was “we want to see Thais fly” because Flyff is an MMORPG game where the in-game characters can fly. As the first service provider to use the “Free to Play” model, Ini3 also launched “Pangya” in the same year. Pangya is a Casual golf fantasy game, developed by Hanbitsoft from South Korea. From the success of servicing Pangya, Ini3 has launched more than 30 online games up to date with more than 17 million registered users.

== Published Games ==
Game	Genre	Developer	Year of launch	Status	Remarks
Lalabell	Social Simulation	Galaxy Funtech	2003		Service ended
Flyff	MMORPG	Gala Lab Global Online Community	2004		Service ended 24 August 2018
Pangya	Casual	NTREEV	2005		Service ended 30 April 2024
Yogurting	MMORPG	Neo Wiz and Entikkus Usoputo	2006		Service ended 29 March 2011
Fanta Tennis	Casual	NPIC SOFT/ Ini3	2006		Service ended 28 February 2014
Pucca Racing	Casual	Gravity/ VOOZ	2008		Service ended 23 March 2010
Black Rogue	MMORPG	Joymax	2009		Service ended 2 December 2012
UMBO	WEB-Based		2010		Service ended
War2	WEB-Based		2010		Service ended 22 May 2012
BOOMz	WEB-Based	7Road	2010		Service ended 28 February 2019
IL:Soulbringer	MMORPG	Gala Lab Global Online Community	2011		Service ended 20 September 2011
3 Kingdoms 2	MMORPG	USER JOY Technology	2011		Service ended 27 May 2014
Cooking Papa	WEB-Based	Cayenne Entertainment Tech	2011		Service ended 17 November 2012
War Story	WEB-Based		2011		Service ended
Club Mstar	Casual	nurien	2011		Service ended 28 October 2014
Ministry of War	WEB-Based	Snail	2012		Service ended
Continent of the Ninth (C9)	Action MMORPG	WEBZEN	2012		Service ended 30 September 2021
GranAge	Side-Scrolling	Logiware	2013		Service ended 29 February 2016
Premier League Live	WEB-Based		2013		Service ended
3 Kingdoms Puzzle Quest	WEB-Puzzle-Base	WeDragon	2013		Service ended 15 October 2013
Divine Warriors	Full 3D MMORPG	InterServ International	2013		Service ended 29 May 2015
Three Kingdoms	WEB-Based	Line Kong	2013		Service ended 28 August 2015
War Emblem II	WEB-Based		2013		Service ended
Divosaga Plus	WEB-Based	7Road & MMOG.asia	2013		Service ended 21 October 2016
Epic Monsters	Mobile		2013		Service ended
Touch Online	WEB-Based	Perfect World	2014		Service ended 30 April 2023
Rhythm N Joy	Mobile	NINEBUD	2014		Service ended 27 March 2016
Pirate Force	Casual	Playcoo	2014		Service ended 15 July 2016
Combo Cat	Mobile	InterServ International	2014		Service ended 29 May 2015
Kungfu Fighting	Mobile	Wuhan Bitgame	2014		Service ended
GunZ2	Action Shooting	MAIET	2014		Service ended 30 November 2017
Shadow of Eclipse	WEB-Based	NIMBLE CREW	2014		Service ended 2 August 2016
Age of Drakness	Mobile	divmob	2015		Service ended 14 February 2017
มังกรหยก Frontier 2015	Mobile	Sina	2015		Service Ended
Age of Warriors	3D Action RPG Mobile	ME	2015		Service ended 25 February 2016
ใบ้คำหรรษา	Mobile	Ini3	2016		Service Ended
SD Gundam Battle Station	Mobile	Ini3	2016		Service Ended
Hearthstone Thai version	Card Game	Blizzard	2016		Service Ended
3ก๊ก Heroes	Mobile	Morefun	2016		Service Ended
Return of the one Thai version	Mobile	Soft BIGBANG	2016		Service Ended
Atlantica Online	MMORPG	Valofe	2017		Service Ended 28 December 2021
Hay Day	Mobile	SuperCell	2017	Online	
Heaven Heroes	Mobile	Ucube	2017		Service Ended
มังกรหยก Origin	Mobile	Perfect World	2018		Service Ended
บ่อน ออนไลน์	Mobile		2018		Service ended 31 October 2019
Audition Mobile	Mobile		2019		Service ended 24 August 2023
Lion Casino	Mobile		2019		Service ended 31 August 2023
Princess Connect! Re:Dive	Mobile		2020	Online	
Audition Puzzle	Mobile		2021		Service ended 30 March 2024
Swords of Legends M	Mobile	Wangyuan Shengtang	2022		Service ended 15 June 2023
