= Super Swing Golf: Season 2 =

2007 video game

- North American version cover art
- Developer: Tecmo
- Publishers: WW: Tecmo; KOR: Ntreev Soft; EU: Rising Star Games
- Platform: Wii
- Release: JP: November 29, 2007; NA: December 11, 2007; KOR: April 26, 2008; EU: July 4, 2008
- Genre: Sports
- Modes: Single player, multiplayer

Super Swing Golf: Season 2 (Super Swing Golf in Europe, and Swing Golf PangYa 2nd Shot!! in Japan) is a golf video game developed and published by Tecmo for the Wii. It was released in the North America on December 11, 2007. It is the sequel to Super Swing Golf, and both are based on the Korean free online multiplayer golf game, PangYa.

== Gameplay ==
Super Swing Golf: Season 2 includes an improved story mode, with an overworld map that does not necessarily follow events in a set order. On top of the multiplayer Stroke Play, Match Play and Balloon Pop games that came with the first game, two new multiplayer games were added to the party mode. The game has largely remained the same beyond these changes, the addition of new courses, and various cosmetic tweaks.

The game has two different control schemes; either using the Swing control scheme with the Wii Remote used as though it were a golf club, or using the Button control scheme which is similar to the Mario Golf-style of control scheme.

== Reception ==
Reception

Aggregate scores
Aggregator	Score
GameRankings	71.69%
Metacritic	70/100

Review scores
Publication	Score
1Up.com	B−
Game Informer	8.5/10
GameRevolution	B
GameSpot	7/10
GameSpy	2.5/5
GamesRadar+	4/5
GameZone	6.5/10
IGN	7.3/10
Nintendo Life	7/10
Nintendo Power	6.5/10

The game was met with average reception upon release; GameRankings gave it a score of 71.69%, while Metacritic gave it 70 out of 100.

GameSpy gave the game two-and-a-half stars out of five, criticizing the game for being more of an expansion pack over the first game than a true sequel. 1UP.com gave the game a B−, reporting that the game has surprising depth that can be off-putting to those just looking to have a good time. IGN handed out a score of 7.3 out of 10, and reported that despite just adding incremental improvements over the previous installments, "Super Swing Golf: Season 2 is still the best overall golf experience you can find on Wii." GameSpot gave the game seven out of ten, calling it a good golf game, despite the minimal improvements over its predecessor.
