= Super Swing Golf =

2006 video game

- North American cover art
- Developer: Ntreev Soft
- Publishers: JP/NA: Tecmo; PAL: Nintendo
- Platform: Wii
- Release: JP: December 2, 2006; NA: December 12, 2006; EU: June 8, 2007; AU: September 6, 2007
- Genre: Golf
- Modes: Single-player, multiplayer

Super Swing Golf is a 2006 golf video game for the Wii developed by Ntreev Soft, based on the online golfing game PangYa. Published by Tecmo, it was a launch title in Japan, named Swing Golf PangYa, then released as Super Swing Golf in North America. In 2007 it was released in the PAL region as PangYa! Golf With Style. The game received a sequel, Super Swing Golf: Season 2.

== Gameplay ==
While very similar to the online PangYa, Super Swing Golf is slightly different in the areas of control and content. Both the single player and multiplayer game feature three different modes of play. In single player, these include a story mode, stroke play mode, and match mode, while in multiplayer, Balloon Pop mode replaces the story mode. In all modes, Pang (currency) can be earned and later spent on additional clothing or gear.

Players use the Wii Remote to scroll and pan around the course, as well as to actually execute shots. To swing, players raise the controller behind them (as with a real golf club) until the on-screen power meter reaches the desired point. Once ready, players then hold down the "A" button and swing forward. The angle and speed of the forward swing is used to determine how close the actual shot comes to the desired shot. If the controller is rotated or twisted as the player swings forward, the resulting shot will hook or slice. An alternative control system is to use just the buttons on the Wii Remote similar to how the game is played on the PC, including the same key combinations for power shots.

The Wii single-player story mode is named PangYa Festa. Complete with an anime-inspired storyline, the objective of this tournament is to defeat all opponents in match play. Players select a character and then a course, which determines the number of holes, typically 3, 6 or 9, and the opponent. As players successfully defeat opponents, they earn the right to play against more difficult opponents on different courses. Winning a given match also unlocks new characters, caddies, and items which can be purchased in the shop. Before and after each match, the player is greeted with a brief cutscene where the player's character and opponent exchange quips with each other and their caddies.

=== Extra content ===
The outfits for the characters Kasumi, Ryu Hayabusa, and Ayane, from Tecmo's Dead or Alive series, appear in the game.

== Reception ==
Reception

Aggregate scores
Aggregator	Score
GameRankings	71.40%
Metacritic	72/100

Review scores
Publication	Score
Electronic Gaming Monthly	5.83/10
Eurogamer	6/10
Famitsu	29/40
Game Informer	8/10
GamePro	3/5
GameRevolution	B
GameSpot	6.8/10
GameSpy	4/5
GameTrailers	7.5/10
GameZone	7.1/10
IGN	(US) 7.3/10 (AU) 7/10
Nintendo Life	8/10
Nintendo Power	7.5/10
Maxim	6/10

The game was met with positive reception. IGN gave it a score of 7.3 out of 10, calling it a fair game with a lot of replay value, but ultimately the rest depended on preference. Yahoo! Games awarded it 4.5/5, saying it was a fun mix between silly swings and serious golf. X-Play gave it four stars out of five for being fun but very difficult in some areas. GameRankings gave the game a score of 71.40%, while Metacritic gave it 72 out of 100.
