= Shot Online =

2004 video game

- Developer(s): WebzenOnNet Co. Ltd.
- Publisher(s): Webzen
- Platform(s): Microsoft Windows, Android
- Genre(s): Sports, MMORPG
- Mode(s): Multiplayer

Shot Online is a massively multiplayer online golf video game which also features character development and MMORPG elements. It is developed by the Seoul-based game developer WebzenOnNet Co. Ltd., and published by Webzen under their game portal website, GamesCampus. Although there is no subscription fee or cost to download and play the game, the game offers upgraded "Gold" membership plans for a monthly fee, and additional items may be purchased using real currency through the game's website.

== History ==
Shot Online was originally created as a Korean title, then later marketed to the United States. Debuting in 2004 as a free online download, this game worked its way onto store shelves in 2006 when a retail version was made available. The game is currently available as a direct download from the publisher's website. Retail boxed versions of the game are no longer available.

Game updates are pushed through an update server with major improvements scheduled every six months. Using this method the developer can make rapid fixes or game changes such as the addition of auction houses to the game. Game developers have promised updates such as graphical improvements in the future.

== Publishing ==
The game is available in eight different languages (English, German, French, Spanish, Korean, Japanese, Simplified Chinese, and Traditional Chinese). Webzen publishes the English version under their game portal, gamescampus.com, and the German, French, and Spanish versions of the game under the portal gamescampus.eu, as well as linking to the game from their main Webzen.com games portal.

== Gameplay ==
=== Introduction ===
The golf simulator allows up to four players to tee-off together on several fictional and non-fictional courses, while The Square allows a player's avatar to interact with NPCs and make trades with other players. For each hole completed, the character earns both experience points and in-game currency called NG ("Not Gold"). When the player accumulates enough experience points, their character will advance to the next level. NG can be used to purchase items such as clubs, balls, clothing, greens fees, and club repair fees.

=== Characters ===
Shot Online is similar to many other MMORPGs in the sense it uses a mixture of player experience and items to increase a players skill. All characters are designed in anime. The game classifies players as Beginner, Amateur, Semi-Pro, Tour-Pro, Senior Pro, Master-Pro, Royal-Pro, Grand Royal Pro, Grand Royal Pro II, National Pro, National Pro II, National Pro III, World Pro I, World Pro II, World Pro III, Honor Pro and Legend Pro. This classification is based on both a player's level and handicap achievements on specific courses. As you progress, more options become available such as the ability to create guilds or use better equipment.

Seven character classes are also available which will give a player different starting abilities based on different character skills. Two character types are only able to be created with a Gold Plus membership.

=== Courses ===
There are a wide variety of courses based on real-world locations and fictional designs. Courses have different green fees, and playing them provides varying bonuses and experience points depending on the difficulty.

== Tournaments ==
A player putting

Tournaments are offered, which can be played at any level. Currently a string of seasonal tournaments are being hosted. In addition to these seasonal tournaments, free tournaments are also offered. Instead of any head-to-head play like in a real tournament, your score is registered upon completion of the course. When the tournament ends winners are declared from the submitted scores.

== See also ==
- GolfStar
- Pangya
