= Ntreev Soft =

South Korean video game studio

Ntreev Soft Co., Ltd.
- Native name: 엔트리브 소프트
- Type: Subsidiary
- Industry: Video games
- Founded: 1 December 2003; 22 years ago
- Defunct: 15 February 2024; 2 years ago
- Fate: Dissolved
- Headquarters: Seongnam, South Korea
- Parent: NCSoft (98%)
- Website: www.ntreev.com

Ntreev Soft (Korean: 엔트리브 소프트) was a South Korean video game development studio primarily known for the development of the online multiplayer golf game PangYa as well as the anime-styled MMORPG Trickster Online.

The developer was shut down on February 15, 2024 by its parent company NCSoft, citing their financial troubles and the developer's string of flops.

== History ==
The company first split off from the South Korean game developer Sonnori in late 2003, and had the majority of its shares bought by iHQ in 2005. Those shares were transferred to the holding company of SK Telecom after they purchased the majority shares of iHQ in 2007, making SK Group the Parent company of Ntreev Soft until 2012.

Ntreev Soft initially used to host the North American version of the MMORPG Grand Chase before transferring the rights to KOG's North American branch KOG Games, then known as Kill3rCombo, in 2010.

On 8 July 2011, NCSoft Corporation started a contract with SK Telecom to acquire Ntreev Soft Co., Ltd. from SK Group because NCSoft has never succeeded in launching casual online games. On 15 February 2012. NCSoft acquired Ntreev Soft from its parent company, SK Telecom.

Ntreev Soft closed down on February 15, 2024, after an attempt at reorganization by its parent company NCsoft and being run on deficit for 11 years.

== Works ==
=== Developed ===
Year	Title	Platforms(s)	Notes	Ref.
2003	Trickster Online	Microsoft Windows	Discontinued in 2014	
2004	PangYa	Microsoft Windows	Discontinued in South Korea in 2016; the last remaining server in Thailand discontinued in 2024	
2006	Super Swing Golf	Wii	Co-developed with Tecmo	
2009	PangYa: Fantasy Golf	PlayStation Portable		
2009	White Day: A Labyrinth Named School	Mobile	A port of the 2001 video game	
2010	Clickr	Microsoft Windows		
2010	Pro-Baseball Manager	Microsoft Windows, Android	Discontinued in 2017	
2011	Alicia	Microsoft Windows	Discontinued in 2014; Community funded servers are still remaining active as of 2026	
2012	MVP Baseball Online	Microsoft Windows	Discontinued in 2016	
2012	Rolling Kongs	iOS		
2017	Pro-Baseball H2	Android, iOS	Discontinued in 2024	
2018	PangYa Mobile	Android	Discontinued in 2020	
2021	Pro-Baseball H3	Android, iOS	Discontinued in 2024	
2021	Trickster M	Android, iOS, Microsoft Windows	Discontinued in 2024	

=== Publishing-only ===
Ntreev Soft published these games in South Korea only unless otherwise noted.

Year	Title	Platforms(s)	Developer(s)	Notes	Ref.
2007	BlackShot	Microsoft Windows	Vertigo Games		
2007	Super Swing Golf: Season 2	Wii	Tecmo		
2008	Crimson Gem Saga	PlayStation Portable	Ironnos		
2008	Grand Chase	Microsoft Windows	KOG Studios	Launched in the North America by Ntreev USA	
2011	Cheonjayeongungjeon	Microsoft Windows	Snail Game	Discontinued in 2012	
2012	Heroes of Newerth	Microsoft Windows	S2 Games; Frostburn Studios	Discontinued in 2013	

=== Cancelled ===
Title	Platforms(s)	Notes	Ref.
PangYa M	Microsoft Windows	Cancelled in 2022	
