= Araya (video game) =

2016 video game

- Developer: MAD Virtual Reality Studio
- Publisher: MAD Virtual Reality Studio
- Engine: Unity
- Platform: Windows
- Release: WW: November 24, 2016
- Genre: Adventure
- Mode: Single-player

ARAYA is a 2016 first person horror-themed adventure game, developed by MAD Virtual Reality Studio for Microsoft Windows.

== Plot ==
The story is told from the perspective of 3 different characters: Marisa, Araya's best friend who enters the hospital after receiving a mysterious text from Araya; Rama, the hospital's security guard, and Boon who enters the hospital to fulfill a gambling debt. The story's perspective shifts between the three characters as players explore different areas of a derelict Bangkok hospital, in order to piece together the mysterious circumstances and solve the murder case of Araya.

Araya was a bipolar and misanthropic young woman who found friendship and comfort with Marisa. Despite Marisa's warning against it, Araya enters a relationship with a playboy named Sorn. The relationship results in an unwanted pregnancy and causes conflict between the couple. For an unknown reason, Sorn procures a "sleeping" pill and gives it to Araya; the pill turns out to be lethal and kills Araya. Not wanting to be blamed for her death, Sorn takes Araya's body to the hospital's parking garage, where he hangs her by a noose and later dies by accident.

A year after Araya's death, Marisa gets a text from her and goes to the now-desolate hospital to investigate. During her exploration, Marisa is chased by a man named Jit, who previously worked there and now stays for an unknown reason, and is knocked unconscious by him.

Rama wakes up after having fallen asleep in the guardhouse and patrols the hospital grounds. Rama spots Jit, who he previously knew, and the unconscious Marisa, and is chased by Jit. Rama later calls for help and meets up with his boss at a different area within the hospital. However, Rama's boss is ambushed and seemingly killed by Jit. Jit chases Rama again, but is knocked out by a falling shelf.

Boon, enters the hospital to complete a task for a gang in order to fulfill his gambling debt. He is encounters the hospital's many ghosts, including a gigantic "Preta," a spirit believed to be children that have sinned against their parents and are punished after death. Later, Boon finally crosses paths with Rama, who tells him to escape while he goes to help Marisa.

After reawakening, Marisa explores the hospital once again, following Araya's spirit. She is once again chased by Jit and falls down an elevator shaft, but is unharmed. Marisa enters a room that has been turned into a ritual chamber where she finds the corpse of Araya, causing her to faint. She wakes up and walks through a nightmarish labyrinth. Towards the end of the maze she hears Sorn and Araya's argument over her pregnancy. Marisa then finds Araya's spirit hanging in the spot where Sorn had left her, whereupon Araya transforms into a vengeful ghost, believing that there is no one left who truly cares for her.

Rama arrives at the ritual chamber and sees Marisa and Araya's corpse. Rama examines Araya's corpse and removes the ritual nail from her forehead, freeing her spirit. After trying to awake Marisa, Jit enters the room and attacks him. Rama overpowers him and the player is given the option to either kill or spare Jit. Rama's boss reappears and knocks him out, blaming Rama for ruining their plan, which involved he and Jit using Araya's spirit for financial gain. Araya's ghost appears behind Rama's boss and attacks him, causing him to knock over an altar of candles, causing a fire that rapidly engulfs the hospital.

Marisa wakes up and runs for the exit, avoiding the fire and Araya. At the exit, the ghost blocks her path. Two endings can occur depending on whether or not Jit was spared. If spared, Jit arrives and stabs the spirit with his sacred dagger. If Jit is killed, it is Rama who attacks Araya instead. Either way, all three main characters escape the now burning hospital.

Marisa wakes up outside the hospital, under care of the police that have arrived on the scene. Rama stares at the burning building, and Boon frantically explains what happened to a policeman. If Jit is spared, he is seen sitting on the ground outside holding his head in his hands. As Marisa looks up at the blaze, an unknown person reaches for her hand.

== Characters ==
- Marisa: A brave, confident girl and the only friend Araya ever had. She came to the hospital because she got a message from her who mysteriously disappeared a year ago.
- Rama: A security guard at the hospital, he witnessed a strange event while he was on patrol.
- Boon: A young guy scared of his own shadow. He is crazy about collecting amulets and is on a mission at the hospital to wipe out his gambling debts once and for all.
- Jit: A necromancer on a murderous spree who happens to be the main antagonist and lead suspect for Araya's murder.
- Boss: Boss of Rama.
- Ploy: Daughter of Rama
- Araya: Friend of Marisa.
- Sorn: Special friend of Araya.
- Shu: Person who Boon owed debt to.

== See also ==
- List of horror video games
