= M.A.S.S. Builder =

2019 fighting video game

M.A.S.S Builder
- Developer(s): Vermillion Digital
- Publisher(s): Sekai Project
- Engine: Unreal Engine 4
- Platform(s): Microsoft Windows
- Release: Microsoft Windows; 13 September 2019
- Genre(s): Fighting RPG
- Mode(s): Single-player Multiplayer

M.A.S.S Builder (also known as Mechanical Assault Skeleton Suit Builder) is an RPG-mech-fighting video game developed by Thai studio The Vermillion Digital and published by Sekai Project. It was released for Microsoft Windows in 2019.

== Gameplay ==
The game is a mix of JRPG and mech building. The game focuses on weapon and upgrades for the MASS as players advance, gather materials and complete missions. Players man a M.A.S.S and they must fight against creatures called Quarks, as well as commanding their own organisation. The game features over 38 different mech parts to assemble and customize with virtual paint and decals. The game is occasionally updated and has weekly development blog posts by the developers.

== Reception ==
On its release, MASS Builder was met with "positive" reviews from critics. BagoGames write that, "While the opening sequence of M.A.S.S. Builder's is a bit cliché, it has a good premise. It immediately grounds the player into a story befitting for Mecha games. Also, the in-game world is somewhat compelling and rich with information to immerse yourself in.
