= Top 10 Student =

South Korean entertainment show

- Hangul: 전교톱10
- RR: Jeongyotop10
- MR: Chŏn'gyot'op10
- Genre: Reality television
- Presented by: Kim Hee-chul; Lee Juck
- Starring: Eunhyuk; Lee Sang-min; Tony Ahn; Kim Hyeong-seok; Park Moonchi
- Country of origin: South Korea
- Original language: Korean
- No. of episodes: 10

Production
- Producer: KBS Entertainment Division
- Running time: 60 minutes

Original release
- Network: KBS 2TV, KBS joy
- Release: October 2 – December 14, 2020

Top 10 Student (Korean: 전교톱10) is a South Korean television program which aired on KBS2 on Monday at 20:30 (KST) from October 2, 2020.

== Format ==
Top 10 Student is a competitive program that reinterprets the once-popular show, Top 10 Songs, into the emotions of teenagers and showcases performances.

== Broadcast time ==
Broadcast period	Airtime
October 2, 2020	Friday 18:50 – 20:00 (1 hour 10 minutes)
October 5, 2020 ~ December 14, 2020	Monday 20:30 – 21:30 (1 hour)

== Cast ==
- MC
  - Lee Juck
  - Kim Hee-chul
- Fixed Panel
  - Lee Sang-min
  - Tony Ahn
  - Kim Hyeong-seok
  - Eunhyuk (Super Junior)
  - Park Moon-chi

== List of episodes and rating ==
- In the ratings below, the highest rating for the show will be in red, and the lowest rating for the show will be in blue.

Ep. #	Air Date	Guest(s)	Rating
1	October 2, 2020	Kim Hyeon-cheol, Seunghee (Oh My Girl), Lee Dae-hwi (AB6IX)	3.2%
2	October 5, 2020	Kim Jung-min, Seunghee (Oh My Girl), Shin Ji (Koyote)	2.0%
3	October 12, 2020	Lee Ji-hoon, Shin Ji (Koyote), Yoon Chae-kyung (April)	2.6%
4	October 19, 2020	Kim Min-jong, Shin Ji (Koyote), Yoon Chae-kyung (April)	3.4%
5	October 26, 2020	Jang Hye-jin, Sandeul (B1A4), YooA (Oh My Girl)	2.4%
6	November 9, 2020	Byun Jin-sub, Sandeul (B1A4), YooA (Oh My Girl)	3.1%
7	November 23, 2020	Loser Resurrection Part 1	2.7%
8	November 30, 2020	Loser Resurrection Part 2	2.9%
9	December 7, 2020	King of Kings Battle Part 1 - Shin Ji (Koyote), Sandeul (B1A4), Ahn Sol-bin (Laboum)	4.0%
10	December 14, 2020	King of Kings Battle Part 2 - Shin Ji (Koyote), Sandeul (B1A4), Ahn Sol-bin (Laboum)	3.9%

== See also ==
- Top 10 Songs
