= White Day: A Labyrinth Named School =

2001 video game and its franchise

- Developer: Sonnori
- Publishers: Wizard Soft; 4AM Entertainment
- Director: Lee Eun-Seok
- Producer: Seo Gwan-hi
- Writer: Lee Jeong-sul
- Composer: Hwang Byung-ki
- Engine: WangReal Engine
- Platform: Microsoft Windows
- Release: KOR: September 5, 2001
- Genres: First-person; Survival horror Adventure; Multiplayer
- Mode: Single player

White Day: A Labyrinth Named School (Korean: 화이트데이: 학교라는 이름의 미궁; RR: Hwaiteudei: hakgyoraneun ireumui migung) is a 2001 survival horror video game developed and published by South Korean studio Sonnori for Microsoft Windows.

The game was remade in 2015 by ROI Games, and was directed and produced by the former CEO (Lee Won-Sool) of Sonnori. The remake was released for mobile phones in 2015, and for Windows and PlayStation 4 platforms on August 22, 2017, through publisher PQube Limited in North American and European markets. A sequel, titled White Day 2: The Flower That Tells Lies, was released in three parts starting in February 2023, taking place after the events of the first game.

== Plot ==
Yeondu High School's construction unbalanced feng shui around the area. It is said that the area used to be a perfect natural landscape before it was built. The school was a hospital during the Korean War. Many visitors and builders died during the building's construction which awakened the power (Qi) from the imbalance of feng shui and the ghosts from the hospital's past. A geomancer was brought in to construct 5 amulets representing the five elements (Wu Xing), who spread them around the school to balance feng shui and to prevent the spirits from interfering with the living. However, it also locked all the spirits inside the school and prevented them from going to the afterlife. This was kept a secret from that day onwards. One spirit, the "Master of the Labyrinth" could not stand being unable to escape the school's hold and sought a way to escape it. It eventually possessed Na-yeong in 1997.

One day, in 1998, a lab fire broke out in the Home Economics room, resulting in the death of Seong-ah, a very close friend of Na-yeong (So-yeong's older sister). Na-yeong began resisting the Master of the Labyrinth. Seong-ah became trapped in the school because of the amulet's power and could not pass on.

The music teacher, Ji-won, had discovered the school's past and began to study it and strongly believed that he could resurrect the dead using the power of feng shui in the area. One day, Seong-ah's mother Eun-mi visited him and asked him to resurrect her daughter. Ji-won decided to help her out to prove his theory. To revive the dead, three people were needed:

1. A person who calls the dead (Seong-ah's mother, Choi Eun-mi)
2. A person to break the seals using the amulets (one who sees ghosts – the music teacher, Ji-won)
3. A sacrifice (Na-yeong).

They successfully called Na-yeong to the school at night, but the ritual failed because the Master of the Labyrinth interfered and prevented Na-yeong from being sacrificed. The seals also had to be broken one by one, with some seals having to remain unbroken while the land regains its strength; otherwise, the spirits will go to the afterlife if all of them are broken. Seong-ah was partially revived and the Master, taking advantage of this, took the empty body/vessel to possess. Her mother lost her sanity and the music teacher committed suicide. Shortly after, Na-yeong tried to resist the Master of the Labyrinth's possession and was forced to hang herself. The Master moved onto the now partially revived Seong-ah and possessed her for the next three years as an empty vessel and posed as a normal student. The possession is explained in one of the notes in the game.

...After more days of research, I theorized about this. I found a possible way to resurrect people from the dead. Let me explain, if you were to find a source of Qi (energy) somewhere in the school coming from the afterlife, and that Qi belonged to the person you're trying to resurrect, if you were to reverse the Qi emanated from the cycle of the dead persons life, you could effectively put the Qi from the afterlife back into its dead body. I desperately wanted to further investigate this, but I had to acknowledge the risks. What if the wrong source of Qi from the afterlife were to go into the wrong dead body? If that were to happen, then the dead body would become possessed. And what if a source of Qi from the afterlife was so strong, it could do this on its own? This school has more threats than I thought. Some sort of resurrection ritual would be incredibly dangerous, I do not want to risk it.

== Gameplay ==
White Day is a first person survival horror with numerous adventure game elements and a plot background based on the ancient Chinese religious studies of Taoism (mainly Wu Xing, Feng Shui and Qi). The game has multiple difficulty modes to choose from; hard and real difficulties are unlocked later.

The game has its own head-up display, where there is a heartbeat icon showing the health condition, a compass acquired early in the game, and a square showing the current equipped item.

There are no weapons in White Day. The player assumes the role of Lee Hui-min, a typical male high school student who cooperates with other students that are trapped in the school: Han So-yeong, Seol Ji-hyeon and Kim Seong-ah. The player must navigate through the school and escape unharmed. The game uses dialogue trees. The dialog choices the player makes when interacting with the NPCs affect the story progression and the ending. There are eight possible endings.

When one of the two Janitors finds the player, he blows his whistle and chases the player until they outrun him or hide successfully. If he catches up to the player, he repeatedly hits them with his bat until they die. The Janitor finds the player much easier if they make loud noises (running, opening doors, turning on lights, etc.). Hiding in darkness does not help as the Janitors have flashlights.

Falling from a height, walking into ghosts, or taking damage from other hazards will cause the screen to flash red and increase the player's heart rate. Running for too long will tire the player and increase their heart rate.

Health items such as Soyabean Milk, Lunch Boxes, and Coffee Cans can recover the player's stamina and health and can be obtained by inserting 500 won coins in vending machines placed in hallways and rooms around the school. The game has several equipable items to assist the player in their journey, like the Matches, the Lighter, and the Flashlight. Throughout the game the player can collect documents that relate to the school, the people in it, and backstories to the ghosts the player encounters.

== Remakes ==
A remake was released in 2009 in South Korea for mobile phones, which replaced the 3D exploration with still 2D drawings.

The game was remade again in 2015, also for mobile phones by developer ROI Games. It was ported to PlayStation 4 and Microsoft Windows worldwide in August 2017.

== Film adaptation ==
A film adaptation was released on October 6, 2021, titled The Labyrinth. Kang Chan-hee played the role of Lee Hee-min, Park Yoo-na as So-young, and Lee Hye-ran as Seoung Ah.
