= PangYa =

Online multiplayer golf video game

Pangya
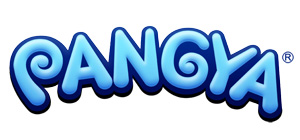
- Developer: Ntreev Soft
- Publishers: KOR: Smilegate Megaport, NHN Corp., WW: Smilegate Europe
- Engine: Wangreal Engine
- Platform: Windows
- Release: KOR: June 2004; NA: 2005
- Genres: Golf, MMORPG
- Modes: Single-player, multiplayer

PangYa (Korean: 팡야, transl. "Bang!") was a free-to-play MMO casual golf simulation video game, designed by South Korean development company Ntreev Soft for Microsoft Windows. Although the game was a realistic simulator, it had fantasy-themed courses and anime-style characters, and the game made use of microtransactions to customize characters. Released in its home country in 2004 before expanding to Japan and other territories, it was released the following year in North America published by GameFactory, where it was initially titled Albatross18. PangYa servers were discontinued in most territories as of 2017, and the last official server, serving Thailand, was shut in 2024. Other PangYa games were also made for the Wii (Super Swing Golf) and PlayStation Portable game consoles, as well as a mobile game on Android and iOS.

== Gameplay ==
Gameplay screenshot of Albatross18

PangYa's gameplay is designed similar to most other golf games. The power and accuracy of a shot are determined by a meter located at the bottom of the screen, using the "three-click method": one click to activate the meter's bar, one click to set power, and one click to set accuracy. Clicking is either done by moving the mouse pointer over the bar and clicking, or simply pressing the space bar.

Should the player hit the ball with perfect (or almost-perfect) accuracy, the shot is called a "PangYa". Missing a PangYa will result in a loss of power, and either a 'hook' (where the ball angles to the left from the intended trajectory) or a 'slice' (where the ball angles to the right from the intended trajectory).

The similarity of PangYa with other online golf games end here. The game's graphics are anime derived, with many of its features stemming from creative imagination, as opposed to realism. Golf clubs resembling household products or baseball bats are used by some characters, and courses such as Silvia Cannon and Wiz Wiz are set in fantasy realms. Additionally, physically impossible special shots can be performed.

=== Game Modes ===
PangYa has several game modes.

- Versus Mode - In versus mode, players compete against each other turn by turn with two to four players for 3, 6, 9, or 18 holes. Winners are determined by score. In the case of a tie, pang is used to choose the winner.
  - Stroke Play is one of the versus mode options where players compete by strokes and score.
  - Match Play, unlike stroke play, is determined by the winner of the hole. Players still have to get a lower score than their opponent on each hole to win the hole, but they must have the most wins to win the whole game. Match play is played with two teams: a red team and a blue team. Players can go up against another player, or play with a partner against another player and their partner. If anyone quits in the middle of a game, the whole game is finished.
- Tournament Mode - A mode where 4 to 30 players compete in real time. There are no turns but there is a ranking system.
  - Regular Tournament mode: There is a ranking system that determines who is the best player of the round. There are also special awards of bonus pang for various accomplishments. Trophies are also earned in this mode.
  - Team Tournament needs 12 to 30 people to play. Like Match Play, there is a red team and a blue team. Both teams need to have an equal number of people in order to start. At the end of the game, each team's score is tallied up and used to determine the winner.
  - Guild Tourney is when a guild battles against another guild. Players need to join a guild to play. Its function is similar to Team Tournament.
- Battle Mode - A special mode of PangYa that differs from the original concept.
  - Pang Battle is a special versus mode where players gamble with pang. Players receive other players' pang for winning a hole. If there is a draw on the hole, it will carry over to the next hole causing it to double or quadruple the amount of the total pang. In case the game is finished and there is still a draw, there will be an approach hole where players have to be the closest to the hole without chipping in at the fastest time.
  - Approach Mode is where 4 to 30 players compete to be the closest and fastest person to the hole without chipping in. In Season 3, players pay 100 pang to play one hole. All pang is stored to a pot, with the top three players splitting the winnings. At rare times, the amount may double or even triple. As of Season 4, entrance fees/gambling have been removed and now participants can play up to nine holes with missions in which they must work together to win items. No missions can appear a lot where its normal approach mode without the gambling unless there are more players playing this mode. Some missions are for genders playing the game, genders of the character, chipping-in, distances, etc. At the end of the game, players get prizes from the treasure chests collected.
- Special Shuffle Course Mode - Each hole is from a different course. The last hole is a special, new course that will give a large reward to players.
- PSq's/Lounges - PSq's, or Player Squares, are where players can socialize and sell consumable pang items and pang clothes in any specific hole and course in the game.
- Practice - Allows players to play the tutorial, as well as Practice courses, and repeat any holes they want to.
- Chip Mode - Lets players practice getting holes in one.

=== Exchange and Upgrade Systems ===
- Tiki's Magic Ball - Tiki's Magic Ball is a recycling system where players can trade their unwanted clubs and equipment for Tiki points. Players can exchange Tiki points for items in Cadie's Cauldron or upgrade their power, control, spin or curve slots in Character Mastery.
- Cadie's Cauldron - Cadie's Cauldron is an exchange shop where players can exchange items to create a more helpful item, as well as allow the player to exchange gatcha items for the same gatcha item just in a different color or style.
- Lolo's Card Deck - Lolo's Card Deck is a card exchange shop where the player can combine 3 cards for a better or worse card.
- Character Mastery - Character Mastery is an upgrade system that allows players to upgrade their power, control, accuracy, spin and curve with pang. Players may also upgrade available slots with Tiki points.
- Club Workshop - Club workshop is a Club Upgrade system that allows players to upgrade their clubs for better stats.

=== Clubs ===
A player will start the game with the default golf club. As the player progresses, they are given the option to purchase new clubs, using either Pang or Cookies (Points in the North America server). Players can also get a free Lucky Air Knight club from the tutorial that works until they rank to Junior E. Club sets differ from each other in term of stats provided, available upgrade slots, level requirement, and appearance. Just like in real golf, PangYa club sets contain 4 basic type of clubs: woods, irons, wedges, and putters.

=== Currency ===
The currency of PangYa is Pang. Pang is normally earned by finishing a hole at par or better, pulling off powerful shots, and making difficult chip-ins. Pang can be used at the Shop to buy equipment or items. Pang can also be used to upgrade equipment such as golf clubs, or the characters themselves, boosting their stats.
A cookie system has also been established on most PangYa servers which allows people to buy equipment and items using real-world currency. Rage Points system (which is a system designed to allow their respective virtual credit systems to be used with multiple games) replaces the cookie system but is identical in usage.

=== Ranking ===
In PangYa, a ranking system is used. As players continue to compete in more games in tournament mode or match play, they will gain more experience points and move up in rank. Most new players, if not all, start off with the Rookie F ranking and work their way up. The current maximum achievable rank is Infinity Legend A. The only exception is the Game Masters, which have their own rank, GM. When displayed in the lobby, this the highest rank of all.

=== Special Shots ===
In PangYa, special shots are achieved by doing different combinations of keys. The standard "perfect shot" is performed by hitting a shot that lands in the white bar, causing a voice to cheer "Pangya!". Under certain conditions, players can hit shots such as the Power Topspin, Power Backspin, and Power Curve, aiding them in avoiding obstacles or chipping the ball into the hole. More complicated shots can be achieved such as the Super Pangya, which adds 10-20 yards to a shot (depending on how many power bars are spent on the shot), as well as the Cobra, Tomahawk and Spike, which change the trajectory of the shot considerably.

== History ==
In Japan, the game launched on November 11, 2004, known as PangYa Exhilarating Golf. In North America, the game launched as and was known as Albatross18: Realms of Pangya, until March 8, 2009 when control of the game was passed from OGPlanet to SG Interactive (then Ntreev USA), which closed the game for a month for technical upgrades and re-released the game as PangYa a month later. In May 2014, SG Interactive transferred the publishing rights to MAYN Interactive and transferred the publishing rights to SmileGate Europe in late 2014.

On December 12, 2016, PangYa's servers in North America shut down, along with its website and forums. The Korean servers were closed on August 29, 2016. Japanese servers, operated by Gamepot, were closed on November 10, 2017. The Thai servers, operated by Ini3 Digital, remained open until April 30, 2024. It was the last official server of Pangya, operating for 19 years.

Below are more details about the PangYa servers.

Server name	Status	Language	Link	Game Version
Smilegate Megaport	Closed September 29, 2016	Korean	http://pangya.gametree.co.kr/	N/A
Gamerage	Closed December 12, 2016	English	https://web.archive.org/web/20130430071101/http://pangya.gamerage.com/	N/A
Pangya JP	Closed November 10, 2017	Japanese	https://web.archive.org/web/20070307001810/http://www.pangya.jp/	7.21
MyGame	Closed on April 30, 2024	Thai	http://pangya.mygame.in.th/main	829.00
Pangya SEA	Closed August 25, 2008	English	http://www.asiasoft.net	?

== Other versions ==
=== Super Swing Golf series ===
First unveiled at Nintendo's E3 press conference during a montage trailer, Super Swing Golf / PangYa! Golf With Style was announced for the Wii gaming system. The game was in joint development by Ntreev Soft and Tecmo, was released on December 2, 2006, by Tecmo in Japan, and was released on December 12 of the same year in the US. Super Swing Golf has been built from the ground up for the Wii but still shares similar attributes with the PC version of the game. The sequel to Super Swing Golf, Super Swing Golf: Season 2, has also been released, featuring new items as well as the Deep Inferno, Pink Wind, and Ice Spa courses from PangYa on PC as well as the Special Shot 'Spike'.

=== PangYa: Fantasy Golf ===
On June 23, 2009, Tomy (under license from SK Telecom) released Pangya: Fantasy Golf for the Sony PSP in North America.

=== PangYa Mobile ===
PangYa Mobile by NCSoft is a mobile version of PangYa released on iOS and Android. It launched on August 1, 2016 in China through Baidu. NCSoft licensed the game to LINE on October 5, 2017 order to launch game services in Thailand, Taiwan, and Indonesia. On December 30, 2019, it was announced on the official Facebook page that PangYa Mobile would close on February 7, 2020. However, NCSoft launched Pangya M , a redeveloped version of PangYa Mobile on July 3, 2020, planned to release as a cross-platform game. It was announced in 2022 that development of PangYa M was halted.

== Reception ==
When it first launched, PangYa attracted considerable praise in South Korea and other parts of Asia. Eurogamer's Keza MacDonald scored the game 8 out of 10 in a 2008 review.

== See also ==
- Everybody's Golf
- GolfStar
- Shot Online
- Winning Putt
