= Yogurting =

2005 video game

- Thai Logo
- Developers: NTIX Soft; Neowiz; REDDUCK Inc. (art work)
- Publisher: JP: GungHo
- Platform: Windows
- Release: KOR: 10 May 2005; JP: 24 November 2005
- Genre: MMORPG
- Mode: massively multiplayer

Yogurting (Korean: 요구르팅 Yogureuting) was an MMORPG (Massively Multiplayer Online Role Playing Game) developed by NTIX Soft in South Korea and released as open-beta on May 10, 2005, and was also released in Japan on November 24, 2005.

Yogurting was an online RPG of modern school life. It took place in "Estiva Academy" and "So-weol Academy" and solves the mystery of Endless Vacation Phenomenon. This is an event that spanned the whole game, causing all teachers and schools to disappear, hence the name "endless vacation".

Shu Shibato, Sayaka Gojo produced webcomics based on the video game.

== Development and release ==
Yogurting was developed by Redduck, then known as Taff System. The development started with a prototype called Magic School Luciad, which has a closed beta service in 2003, but it was later changed to the current title. The open beta of Yogurting started on 10 May 2005. This version had a level-based, episodic structure, but after negative reception, the developer converted the game into an MMORPG.

A promotional video released in June 2005 entitled "Always", featuring Koyote member Shin Ji.

Yogurting was shut down on 27 February 2007 in South Korea. The Japanese server shut down in May 2010. In Thailand, servers shut down on March 29, 2011.

== Reception ==
Scott Sharkey from 1UP.com awarded Yogurting for #2 in "Worst Games, Best Names" category.

== Legacy ==
A mobile puzzle game titled Yogurting Pop was first released in November 2014.
