= Đỗ Duy Nam =

Vietnamese actor, comedian and television personality (born 1990)

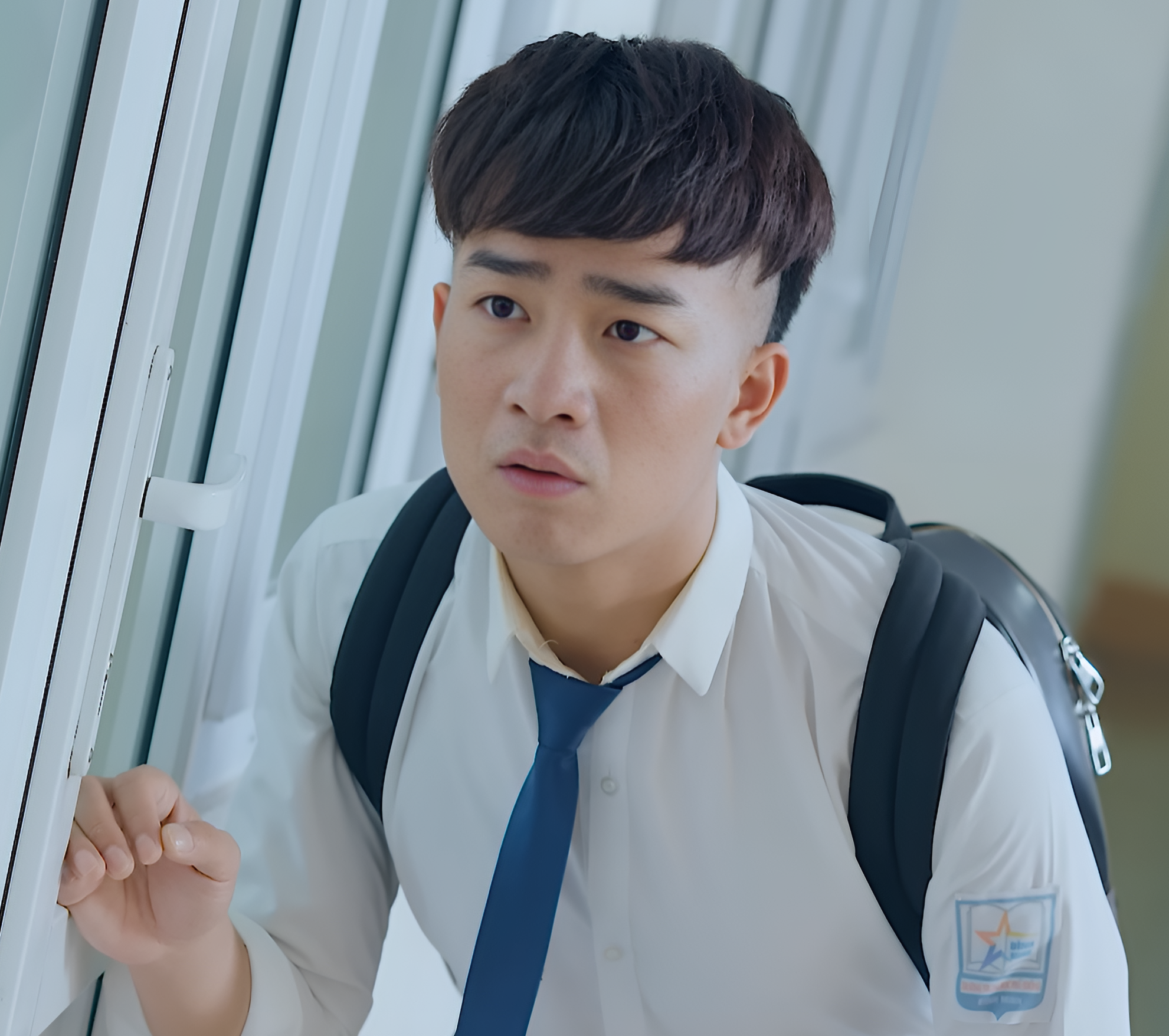
- Đỗ Duy Nam in 2019
- Born: June 8, 1990 (age 36); Bac Ha, Lao Cai, Vietnam
- Education: Trường Đại học Sân khấu – Điện ảnh Hà Nội
- Occupations: Singer; Comedian; Celebrity
- Spouse: Nguyễn Ngọc Anh (m. 2016)

YouTube information
- Channel: Đỗ Duy Nam
- Years active: 2013–present
- Genres: Entertainment; Musician
- Subscribers: 2.73 million
- Views: 1.45 billion
- Last updated: March 10, 2026

Đỗ Duy Nam (born June 8, 1990) is a Vietnamese singer, comedian, and television personality. He is known for his parody songs and supporting roles in the Vietnamese television program "Gặp nhau cuối năm" as well as replacing Xuân Bắc in the lead role of Nam Tào.

== Biography ==
Đỗ Duy Nam was born on June 8, 1990, in Bắc Hà town, Bắc Hà district, Lào Cai province, but his ancestral home is in Nam Định. His parents always encouraged him to study agriculture.

== Career ==
In 2008, Duy Nam enrolled in the Acting Department of the Hanoi University of Theatre and Film. In 2009, he played the role of Phác in the tragedy "Những giọt máu" and won first prize in the University of Theatre and Film's Student Talent Competition.

In 2012, he was sent to participate in the Beijing International Theatre Festival and won the Best Actor award for the Vietnamese delegation; in the same year, he graduated as valedictorian with his self-written play "A-Páo", and was accepted into the Youth Theatre. In 2013, Duy Nam won the Best Actor award at the Asian Theatre Festival and the Gold Medal at the Lưu Quang Vũ. During this period, he had not yet achieved any truly outstanding accomplishments, until 2015 when he began to gain more attention when he appeared in a series of films such as: Sóng ngầm, Chung cư 22+, Bữa trưa vui vẻ, and other popular sitcoms. As a professionally trained actor, Đỗ Duy Nam showed excellent acting ability and singing talent when participating in the 4th season of the "Familiar Faces" competition. In addition, he also appeared in the "Táo Quân" program, transforming into "Cô Đẩu thử việc", "Phó Thiên Lôi", "Nam Tào"...

In addition, Duy Nam is also known for a series of humorous parody songs that have millions of views, such as "Mùa yêu U23" and "Chắc ai đó sẽ về".

== Private life ==
In 2016, Đỗ Duy Nam married Nguyễn Ngọc Anh (Berry) – an actress of the Youth Theatre – after three years of getting to know each other. He and Ngọc Anh have two children together.

== Work ==
=== Movies ===
==== Television ====
Year	Movie title	Role	Director	Channel	Original
2012	Về nơi bình yên	Long	Đỗ Chí Hướng	VTV6	
2012	Khi chàng trai yêu	Thanh	Bùi Bài Bình	SCTV14	
2013	Tình như chiếc bóng	Đạt	Nguyễn Tiến Thành	TodayTV	
2015	Sóng ngầm	Thắng	Nguyễn Mạnh Hà	VTV1	
2016	Mạch ngầm vùng biên ải	Cường	Bùi Huy Thuần	VTV1	
2017	Làm chồng đại gia	Dân	Danh Sơn – Trần Lực	VTV3	
2018	Yêu thì ghét thôi	Dũng	Trịnh Lê Phong	VTV3	
2019	Mê cung	Thịnh "ngựa"	Nguyễn Khải Anh – Trần Trọng Khôi	VTV3	
2019	Những nhân viên gương mẫu	Nam	Lê Mạnh – Vũ Trường Khoa	VTV1	
2019	Ánh sáng trước mặt	Vu	Trần Hoài Sơn – Nguyễn Danh Dũng	VTV8	
2020	Hướng dương ngược nắng	Hải Anh	Vũ Trường Khoa	VTV3	
2021	Hương vị tình thân	Ông Tuấn (lúc trẻ)	Nguyễn Danh Dũng	VTV1	
2021	Ngày mai bình yên	Tuấn	Vũ Trường Khoa – Hoàng Tích Thiện	VTV3	
2021	Thương ngày nắng về	Việt	Bùi Tiến Huy – Vũ Trường Khoa	VTV3	
2023	Biệt dược đen	Trần Thành Đạt	Phạm Gia Phương – Trần Trọng Khôi	VTV3	
2024	Độc đạo	Đặng Bá Tân	Phạm Gia Phương – Trần Trọng Khôi	VTV3	

==== Cinema ====
Year	Movie title	Role	Director	Original
2017	Ván cờ vồ 4		Lê Hồng Quang	
2018	Yêu nữ siêu quậy	Khánh	Ngọc Hùng	

=== Parody ===
Year	Movie title	Original work	Original artist	Original
2017	Quăng tao cái xô	Quăng tao cái boom	Huỳnh James, Pjnboys	
2017	Ông bố mưa	Em gái mưa	Hương Tràm	
2017	Anh trai nhọ	Em gái mưa	Hương Tràm	
2017	Túy dương	Túy âm	Xesi, Masew, Nhatnguyen	
2017	Mặt trời của anh	Kén duyên	Rum, Nit, Masew	
2018	Quoắt đại ca	Người lạ ơi	Superbrothers, Karik, Orange	
2018	Quoắt đại ca	Buồn của anh	K-ICM, Đạt G, Masew	
2018	Đời trộm chó	Anh sai rồi anh xin lỗi em đi	Chi Pu	
2018	Ghét thì yêu thôi			
2018	Đời ở rể	Talk To Me	Chi Pu	
2018	Ngày nhập ngũ	Mình cưới nhau đi	Huỳnh James, Pjnboys	
2018	Quan trọng là bản lĩnh	Quan trọng là thần thái	Only C, Karik	
2018	Ngã rẽ cuộc đời	Người âm phủ	Osad, VRT	
2018	Ngã rẽ cuộc đời	Shalala	Vengaboy	
2018	Ngã rẽ cuộc đời	Love more i can say	Leo Sayer	
2018	Kiếp giang hồ			
2018	Ngày nhập ngũ 2	Cô gái M52	Huy R	
2018	Đầu gấu học đường			
2018	Lá bùa vùng cao			
2018	Ước mơ đổi vợ			
2018	Đội bóng học đường	Cùng anh	Ngọc Dolil	
2018	Đội bóng học đường	Hổng dám đâu	Xuân Mai	
2019	Cho vay tiền mất bạn			
2019	Người phản bội 2K			
2019	Đại ca tán gái			
2019	Lệnh truy nã			
2019	Kiệu hoa			
2019	Về nhà đi chồng	Mây và núi	The Bells	
2019	Về nhà đi chồng	Cuộc vui cô đơn	Lê Bảo Bình	
2019	Ánh nắng của cha			
2019	Để thịnh ngựa nói cho mà nghe	Hãy trao cho anh	Sơn Tùng M-TP	
2019	Để thịnh ngựa nói cho mà nghe	Để mị nói cho mà nghe	Hoàng Thùy Linh	

== Television program ==
- Bữa trưa vui vẻ (VTV6)
- Xả xì chét (VTV3)
- Chung cư 22+ (VTV6)
- Rubic 8 (VTV3)
- Gương mặt thân quen (VTV3)
- Muôn màu Showbiz (VTV9)
- Trò chơi âm nhạc (VTV3)
- Nhanh như chớp nhí (HTV2 – Vie Channel)
- Hãy chọn giá đúng (VTV3)
- Ơn giời cậu đây rồi (VTV3)
- Người ấy là ai (HTV2 – Vie Channel)
- Gặp nhau cuối năm (VTV)
- Gala cười (VTV)
- Đêm tiệc cùng sao (VTV3)
- Vì bạn xứng đáng (VTV3)
- VTV Arawds (VTV1)
- Ký ức vui vẻ (VTV3)
- Phụ Nữ Số 1 (VTV3)
- Bản tin Thế hệ số
- Thông Điệp Cuộc Sống
- Chém Chuối cuối tuần
- Cuộc hẹn cuối tuần (VTV3)
- Ẩm thực kỳ thú (VTV3)
- Chiến sĩ 2020 (VTV3)
- Ghế không tựa (VTV6)
- Chúng tôi – chiến sĩ (VTV3)
- Làng vui (VTV3)
- 2 ngày 1 đêm (HTV7)
- Giờ thứ 9+ (VTV3)
- Chiếc nón kỳ diệu (VTV3)
- Đuổi hình bắt chữ (HanoiTV1)
- Những mảng màu cuộc sống (VTV2)
- Mái ấm gia đình Việt (HTV7)
- Gặp nhau cuối tuần (VTV3)
- Đẹp +84 (VTV3)
- Khách sạn 5 sao (VTV3)
- Mùa hè lấp lánh (VTV3)

== Award ==
Year	Event	Category	Work	Role	Result	Original
2012	International Theatre Festival at Beijing	Outstanding actor	Propose – (Anton Pavlovich Chekhov)		Won	
2013	Lưu Quang Vũ Theatre Festival	Standard stage actor	The Ninth Oath	Đôn "sứt"	Gold Medal	
2015	VTV Awards	Impressive male actor	Undercurrents	Won	Nominated	
