= Japanese folklore =

Folk traditions of Japan

Japanese folklore encompasses the informally learned folk traditions of Japan and the Japanese people as expressed in its oral traditions, customs, and material culture.

In Japanese, the term minkan denshō (民間伝承; "transmissions among the folk") is used to describe folklore. The academic study of folklore is known as minzokugaku (民俗学). Folklorists also employ the term minzoku shiryō (民俗資料) or "folklore material" refer to the objects and arts they study.

== Folk religion ==
Men dressed as Namahage, wearing ogre-like masks and traditional straw capes (mino) make rounds of homes, in an annual ritual of the Oga Peninsula area of the Northeast region. These ogre-men masquerade as kami looking to instill fear in the children who are lazily idling around the fire. Those event is a particularly colorful example of folk practice still kept alive.

A parallel custom is the secretive Akamata-Kuromata ritual of the Yaeyama Islands, Okinawa which does not allow itself to be photographed.

Many, though increasingly fewer households maintain a kamidana or a small Shinto altar shelf. The Shinto version of the kitchen god is the Kamado kami (かまど神), and the syncretic Buddhist version is the Kōjin, a deity of the hearth enshrined in the kitchen.

Japanese popular cults or kō (講) are sometimes devoted to particular deities and buddhas, e.g. the angry Fudō Myōō or the healer Yakushi Nyorai. But many cults are centered around paying respects to sacred sites such as the Ise Shrine (Ise-kō or okage-mairi) or Mount Fuji (Fuji-kō, by which many local mock-Fuji shrines have been erected). Pilgrimage to these meccas declined after the Edo period. But recently, the Shikoku Pilgrimage of the eighty-eight temple sites (commonly known as ohenro-san) has become fashionable. Popular media and cottage industries now extoll a number of shrines and sacred natural sites as power spots.

There is a long list of practices performed to ward off evil (yakuyoke (厄除け)) or expel evil (yakubarai, oharai (yaku-barai)), e.g. sounding the drums. In some areas it is common to place a small mound of salt outside the house (morijio). Salt scattering is generally considered purifying (it is employed in sumo tournaments, to give a well-known example). A stock routine in period or even contemporary drama involves a master of the house telling his wife to scatter salt after an undesirable visitor has just left. Contrarily, lighting sparks with flint just as someone is leaving the house was considered lucky.

No one now engages in the silent vigil required by the Kōshin cult, but it might be noted that this cult has been associated with the iconic three See no evil, hear no evil, speak no evil monkeys.

There are certain vestiges of geomancy introduced into Japan from China through Onmyōdō. The word kimon, "ogre's gate," colloquially refers to anything that a person may have constant ill luck with, but in the original sense designates the northeasterly direction, considered to be unlucky or dangerously inviting of ill-intended spirits (cf. Konjin). There is also a Japanese version of Feng Shui known as kasō or literally "house physiognomy." Closely connected is the Yin-yang path or Onmyōdō, and its concepts such as katatagae also known as kataimi, which was widely practiced by nobles in the Heian period. A widely known taboo (kitamakura) advises against sleeping with your head faced north, though it is doubtful if anyone now seriously heeds this prohibition.

In Japanese folklore, pheasants were considered messengers from heaven. However, researchers from Japan's Graduate University for Advanced Studies and National Institute of Polar Research claimed in March 2020 that red pheasant tails witnessed across the night sky over Japan in 620 A.D., might be a red aurora produced during a magnetic storm.

== Folktales ==
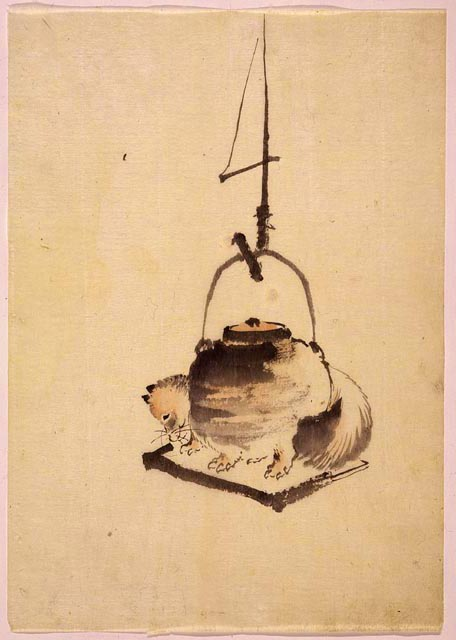
A raccoon dog half transformed into a cauldron hangs from a jizai kagi hook over an irori hearth (scene from the tale Bunbuku Chagama). C. 1840s, School of Hokusai.

As in most developed nations, it is increasingly difficult to find living storytellers of oral tradition. But there is a wealth of folktales collected through the ages. The name mukashi-banashi (tales of "long ago" or from "bygone times") has been applied to the common folktale, since they typically open with the formula "Mukashi..." (akin to "Once upon a time..."). They also close with some set phrase like "dotto harai" (a variant form being Dondo Hare).

These tales had been told in their local dialects, which may be difficult to understand to outsiders, both because of intonation and pronunciation differences, conjugations, and vocabulary. Many folktales collected from the field are actually "translations" into standard Japanese (or more like adaptations, merging several collected versions).

=== Classic folktales ===
Classic folktales such as Momotarō, which most Japanese today are familiarized through pictured children's storybooks, manga, or other popularizations, can be traced to picture-books printed in the Edo period, though their prototypical stories may go back much further. The versions retold by children's story author Sazanami Iwaya (1870–1933; often considered the Perrault of Japan) had a strong hand in establishing the forms usually known today.

=== Animals in folktales ===
Two creatures are particularly known for their abilities to transform into humans or other beings and objects, the kitsune (fox) and tanuki (the Japanese raccoon dog; pictured). They occur frequently in folktales of humorous nature, such as the tanuki, Bunbuku Chagama, who could shapeshift into a teapot.

Marriages between humans and non-humans (irui konin tan (異類婚姻譚, "tales of heterotype marriages")) comprise a major category or motif in Japanese folklore. Japanese heterotype examples such as the crane story describes a sustained period of married life between the interspecies couple, in contrast to Western examples like the Frog Prince or the Leda myth where the supernatural encounter is brief. An unusual pairing occurs in the story of the Hamaguri nyōbo (蛤女房, "clam wife"), which exists in both a politer written version (otogi-zōshi) and in a more rustic and vulgar oral tale. The gender is reversed in the tale of Tanishi chōja where a bride is wedded to a tiny tanishi (river snail).

=== Modern renditions ===
A number of folktales were adapted for stage performance by playwright Junji Kinoshita, notably Yūzuru (Twilight Crane, 1949), based on the folktale Tsuru no Ongaeshi or "a crane who repaid its gratitude."

=== Fantastic creatures ===
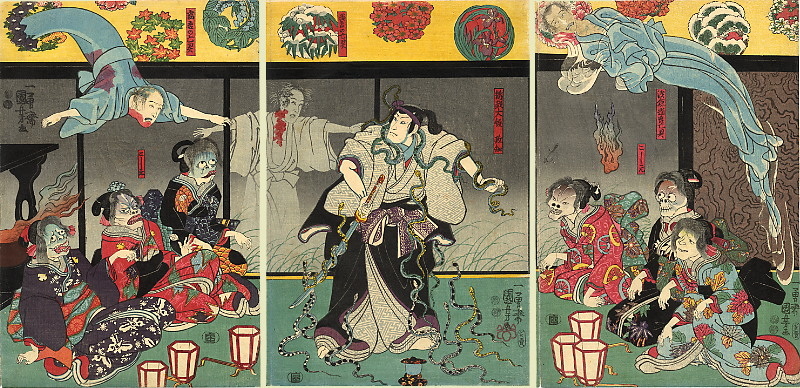
Kuniyoshi Utagawa, The Ghosts, c. 1850

A great deal of interest currently gravitates towards Japanese monsters taken from traditional Japanese sources. Some of the yōkai (demons of Japan) or strange beings are the stuff of folklore, orally transmitted and propagated among the populace. But one must realize that many beings or stories about them were spun and deliberately invented by professional writers during the Edo Period and earlier, and they are not folkloric in the strict sense.

== Folk art and craft ==
Some well-known craft objects, such as netsuke, raccoon dog earthenware (Shigaraki ware), may be classed as traditional Japanese crafts.

A number of articles of daily household use (mingu (民具)), amassed by Keizo Shibusawa, became the Attic Museum collection, now mostly housed in the National Museum of Ethnology in Suita, Osaka. The Mingei movement spearheaded by Yanagi Sōetsu sought to appreciate folk craft from an aesthetic viewpoint.

=== Representative art ===
- Ōtsu-e, a type of folk painting produced in Ōtsu in Shiga Prefecture, often depicting ogre-like figures, purchased as an amulet for travelers.
- Ema, wooden plaques with paintings of horses or other figures, on which wishes are written and hung in shrines.
- Koinobori, carp-shaped banners.

=== Toys ===
- Zuguri, a type of top with concentric patterns drawn in the concave depression(Aomori Prefecture)
- Akabeko, a red papier-mâché bull or cow with a bobbing head.
- Okiagari-koboshi, a legless bottom-loaded doll that rights itself.
- Miharu-goma (Fukushima Prefecture), Yawatauma (Aomori Prefecture), and Kinoshita-goma (Miyagi Prefecture) are the three major wooden carved horse figurines.

=== Textiles ===
- Kogin-zashi (Aomori Prefecture), a type of quilted clothing.

=== Articles of clothing ===
Some of the articles below are essential for understanding traditional Japanese culture. The type of material used is also part of folklore.

- Kasa are hats woven from sedge, soft rush, strips of bamboo, or strips of hinoki cypress.
- Mino, a bushy cape made from rice straw, was used as rain gear and snow gear. Snow boots were also woven from rice straw.
- Waraji, straw-woven footwear.
- Bandori (Yamagata Prefecture and other regions) is a type of often colorfully woven back strap used when carrying loads on one's back.

== See also ==
- Folklore of the Tsugaru region
- Japanese urban legend
- List of legendary creatures from Japan

== Sources ==
Dictionaries and encyclopedias

- Murakami, Shigeyoshi (1988). 日本宗教事典 [Japanese religion dictionary]. Kodansha. ISBN 978-4-06-158837-0.
- Bocking, Brian (1997). A Popular Dictionary of Shintō. Psychology Press. ISBN 978-0-7007-1051-5.

Monographs, studies

- Bernard, Frank (1958). Kata-imi et kata-tagae; étude sur les interdits de direction á l'époque Heian. Tokyo: Presses Universitaires de France.
- Bestor, Victoria Lyon; Bestor, Theodore C., eds. (2011). Routledge Handbook of Japanese Culture and Society. Akiko Yamagata. Taylor & Francis. ISBN 978-1-136-73627-8.
- Bownas, Geoffrey; Brown, Pauline (2004). Japanese Rainmaking And Other Folk Practices. Psychology Press. ISBN 978-0-415-33069-5.,
- Kornicki, Peter Francis; McMullen, James (1996). Religion in Japan: Arrows to Heaven and Earth. Cambridge University Press. ISBN 978-0-521-55028-4.
- Plutschow, Herbert E. (1990). Chaos and Cosmos: Ritual in Early and Medieval Japanese Literature. Brill. ISBN 978-90-04-08628-9.
- Schnelle, Scott (1999). The Rousing Drum: Ritual Practice in a Japanese Community. University of Hawaii Press. ISBN 978-0-8248-2141-8.
