= Nguyễn Xuân Bắc =

Nguyễn Xuân Bắc may refer to:

- Xuân Bắc, Vietnamese comedian, actor and MC.
- Nguyễn Xuân Bắc (footballer), Vietnamese footballer.
