= Zaotang =

Chinese type of candy

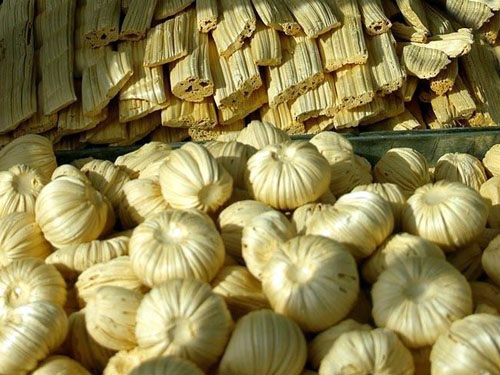
Zaotang and Tanggua

Zaotang (Chinese: 灶糖; pinyin: Zào Táng; lit. 'hearth candy') or "candy for the Kitchen God" is a kind of candy made of maltose that people in China use as a sacrifice to the kitchen god around the twenty third day of the twelfth lunar month just before Chinese New Year. According to its difference in shape, zaotang is also called Guandong tang (Chinese: 关东糖; Pinyin: Guān Dōng Táng) or Tanggua (Chinese: 糖瓜; Pinyin: Táng Guā; Literally "sugar melon"). Guandong tang refers to stick shaped candy with a thickness of 2 cm and a hollow in the center. Tanggua is made into melon shape and sometimes with sesame on the surface.

As the legend goes, the Kitchen God is sent to the earth by the Jade Emperor to supervise life of every household. The Kitchen god will return to Heaven to report the activities of every household over the past year to the Jade Emperor on the 23rd of 12th lunar month, which is called the Kitchen God Festival or the Little new year. People offer the Zaotang to the Kitchen God to sweeten his words to the Jade Emperor or to stick his teeth together to prevent him from saying bad words.

Zaotang are only produced around the Kitchen God Festival when most of China is experiencing freezing weather. The candies are sold outside on the street so that they won't melt and the tiny bubbles inside the candy create a special crispy and fragrant taste.

== Origin of Zaotang ==
The tradition of people offering sacrifice to the kitchen god can date back to the Han dynasty. Houhan Shu （后汉书，The History of the Later Han) recorded a man offered an antelope as a sacrifice to the Kitchen God and got the bless from the Kitchen God, thus his family gained and retained fortune and fame for three generations.

During the period of Three Kingdoms, people in Eastern Wu Kingdom offered liquor as a sacrifice to the Kitchen God . People in the Song dynasty started using Zaotang as a sacrifice to the Kitchen God to sweeten his words so that he wouldn't say bad things to the Jade Emperor. Some people also say that when Zaotang melts, it becomes sticky and stick the Kitchen God's teeth so that he is unable to talk when reporting to the Jade Emperor. Up till now, people in China still keep this tradition and produce Zaotang every year around the Kitchen God Festival.

== Legend of the Kitchen God ==
Studies of Chinese religion indicate that the Kitchen God did not appear until the invention of the brick stove. It is believed that the Fire God, who was worshiped long before the stove was invented, is the earlier form of the Kitchen God. Thus, the legend of the Kitchen God has many versions based on the stove or the Fire God .

=== Ancient Emperor ===
Some literature describes the Kitchen God as a descendant of ancient emperor or the ancient emperor himself. According to Huainanzi,(淮南子） , after Yan Emperor, who was in charge of fire, died, he became the God of Kitchen to enjoy the worship of his descendants. Rites of Zhou (周礼） has indicated that the Kitchen God was Li Zhurong (黎祝融), the son of Zhuanxu who was the grandson of the Yellow Emperor. The same kind of description also appears in Lüshi Chunqiu (吕氏春秋，Mister Lü's Spring and Autumn [Annals]）: "Zhurong, who was the descendant of Zhuanxu Emperor, became the Fire God" . These historical records indicate that ancient Chinese people believed that the Kitchen God was the Fire God. Because the Yan Emperor and Zhurong were all related to fire management, they became the Kitchen God in the legend.

=== Ghost ===
Some ancient people believed that the Kitchen God originally resided in the stove and later took on human form. Zhuangzi recorded: "there's a ghost hidden in the water named Lü (Chinese: 履), a ghost living in the stove named Ji (Chinese: 髻)". Ji (Chinese: 髻) refers to the hairstyle of women in old times, thus some people believed the Kitchen God was a beautiful woman in red clothes. Another historical record shows that the Kitchen God was born into human form and immediately walked into the stove after birth. Some even say the Kitchen God is a couple, the male God was Su Jili (Chinese: 苏吉利) and the female was named Bojia (Chinese: 博颊).

=== Mortal man ===
This is the most popular legend of the Kitchen God nowadays. The Kitchen God was a man living on earth named Zhang Chan who grew up in a rich family and lived happily with his wife. However, several years later, he got fed up with his wife and left her for a younger woman. His wife had to move to another city. One winter after his wife left, Zhang's residence caught fire and everything was burnt. Chan's eyes became blind and he had to beg for food on the street. One day, when he was begging at a house, the hostess pitied him and invited him for dinner. During the meal, Chan realized the hostess was his ex-wife. Being so embarrassed and ashamed of himself, he jumped into the stove and burned to death. On hearing the story, the Jade Emperor took pity on him and assigned him the Kitchen God. He needs to supervise every household on earth and report all the good deeds and evil things on earth. However, people didn't trust Chan according to his past, so they provided Zaotang to him to remind him to say sweet words about them to the Empire.

== Production ==
The procedure for making Zaotang is pretty complex, even though the equipment seems easy to handle. A typical procedure contains five steps. The equipment needed is a stew pot, a big jar, a stick and a kitchen board.

=== Ingredient ===
The ingredients for Zaotang can be millet, barnyard millet, rice, corn or barley malt. The best choice will be glutinous proso millet, as it requires less time to produce a sticky mixture.

The ingredients must be washed thoroughly to clean all the bran and impurities. Then they can be placed in the stew pot for boiling.

=== Boiling sugar ===
Boiling is the process of heating the ingredient until all the water has escaped and a uniform sticky mixture forms. The most important thing during boiling is heat control. If too much heat is used, the sugar will be overcooked and won't have the crispy taste. On the other hand, if the heat is not high enough, the sugar won't be sticky at all.

The semi-solid condition of sugar is called sugar paste. By the time sugar paste starts to form, the temperature of the mixture can reach 158 °C to 160 °C. Experienced Zaotang makers use a stick to draw some paste: if a white and transparent sugar wire can be drawn from the paste and the mixture stops producing bubbles on the surface, the sugar paste is ready for the next step.

=== Cooling the sugar paste ===
The sugar paste needs to be taken out of pot and put into the jar to cool down. When the temperature of the paste reaches 80 °C, it is ready for kneading.

=== Kneading ===
Kneading of the sugar makes the paste more uniform and dense. This process requires much energy and technique. If the temperature of the paste goes too low, it will harden and become solid. Typically, one pot produces 25 kg of sugar paste and only 3 kg of it can be kneaded each time. The process is a race against time.

=== Pulling ===
The last step requires two people to pull the paste, fold it, and pull again and repeat this process several times until a honeycomb structure forms inside the paste. Then the paste can be chopped into a rectangular or melon shape and stored in the fridge.

== See also ==
- Tiler Khaja
- List of candies
