= Kitchen god =

Deities that represent the kitchen

A kitchen god is a deity of the kitchen, found in East Asian religions. Kitchen gods include:

- Kitchen God, named Zao Jun, Zao Shen, Zao kimjah, Cokimjah or Zhang Lang, the Chinese kitchen god.
- Jowangsin, the Korean kitchen god.
- Kōjin, the Japanese kitchen god.
- Ông Táo, the Vietnamese kitchen god.
