= Enzhugong =

Honorary title

Enzhugong (Chinese: 恩主公; pinyin: ēnzhǔgōng; Pe̍h-ōe-jī: Un-tsú-kon) or 'Beneficent Lord' is an honorary title for certain Chinese deities worshipped by Chinese folk religion devotees and Taoists in Taiwan, especially within the Fuji Traditions. It is mainly dedicated for Lord Guan or Guansheng Dijun (關聖帝君), but also dedicated for several other deities like Chunyang Zushi (純陽祖師) or Siming Zhenjun (司命真君). Most Enzhugong's temples are usually dedicated to three or five deities, however there are also temples dedicated to more deities including Lord Guan.
