= Black Narcotic =

2023 Vietnamese television series

- Written by: Phạm Đình Hải; Vũ Liêm; Nguyễn Trung Dũng
- Directed by: Phạm Gia Phương; Trần Trọng Khôi
- Voices of: Trần Đức; Phạm Bảo Anh; Huỳnh Anh; Ngọc Quỳnh; Bình An; Đỗ Duy Nam
- Country of origin: Vietnam
- Original language: Vietnamese
- No. of episodes: 27

Production
- Cinematography: Trần Kim Vũ; Nguyễn Tuấn Dũng
- Running time: 45 – 50 minutes/episode (not including ads)
- Production companies: Vietnam Television Film Center; Vietnam Television

Original release
- Network: VTV3
- Release: September 4 – November 1, 2023

Criminal Police: Black Narcotic (Vietnamese: Biệt dược đen, former name: Phía sau sự thật) is a Vietnamese television series. The television series aired on 9:40 p.m. every Monday, Tuesday and Wednesday starting on September 4, 2023, and ended on November 1, 2023, on VTV3.

== Actor ==
=== Main actors ===
- Phạm Bảo Anh as Đỗ Thanh Tuyển
- Huỳnh Anh as Nguyễn Thanh Tuấn
  - Trần Bảo Nam as Child Tuấn
- Lê Hoàng Long as Phạm Minh Cảnh
- Ngọc Quỳnh as Phạm Xuân Vinh
- Lương Thanh as Lê Thùy Dương
- Huyền Trang Mù Tạt as Trương Mỹ Lan
- Bình An as Nguyễn Hoàng Long
- Phạm Tuấn Anh as Đặng Quốc Vương
- Đỗ Duy Nam as Trần Thành Đạt (Đạt "crazy"/Kira 01)
- Hoàng Anh Vũ as Lý Mạnh Cường
- Trần Đức as Nguyễn Kim Hoàng (Hoàng Kim Đường)
- Hoàng Xuân as Mrs. Nga
- Thanh Huế as Vân
- Trương Hoàng as Trịnh Văn Tiến
- Quỳnh Châu as Nguyễn Minh Tuyết
- Thái Sơn as Trương Quang Điều (Điều "bartender")
- Xuân Trường as Nguyễn Quang Sáng (Bùi Quang Sáng)
- Lê Na as Nguyễn Vân Thùy (Hoa Lê Trắng/Kira 02)

=== Supporting actors ===
- Trần Quốc Trọng as Lý Phan
- Dương Đức Quang as Đại tá Lê Hải Sơn
- Phú Thăng as Đạt's father
- Vĩnh Xương as Nguyễn Hoàng Phi
- Trịnh Mai Nguyên as Mr. Hiếu
- Nguyệt Hằng as Mrs. Liễu
- Huyền Trang as Kiều Phượng (Geisha 02)
- Bùi Hồng Nhật Hà as Oanh (Geisha 01)
- Khánh Linh as Kiều Diễm
- Hồng Ngọc as Đức
- Nguyễn Phương My as Tuấn s' mother
- Bùi Hồng Nhung as Linh
