= Tiler Khaja =

Popular sweets of Kushtia district in Bangladesh

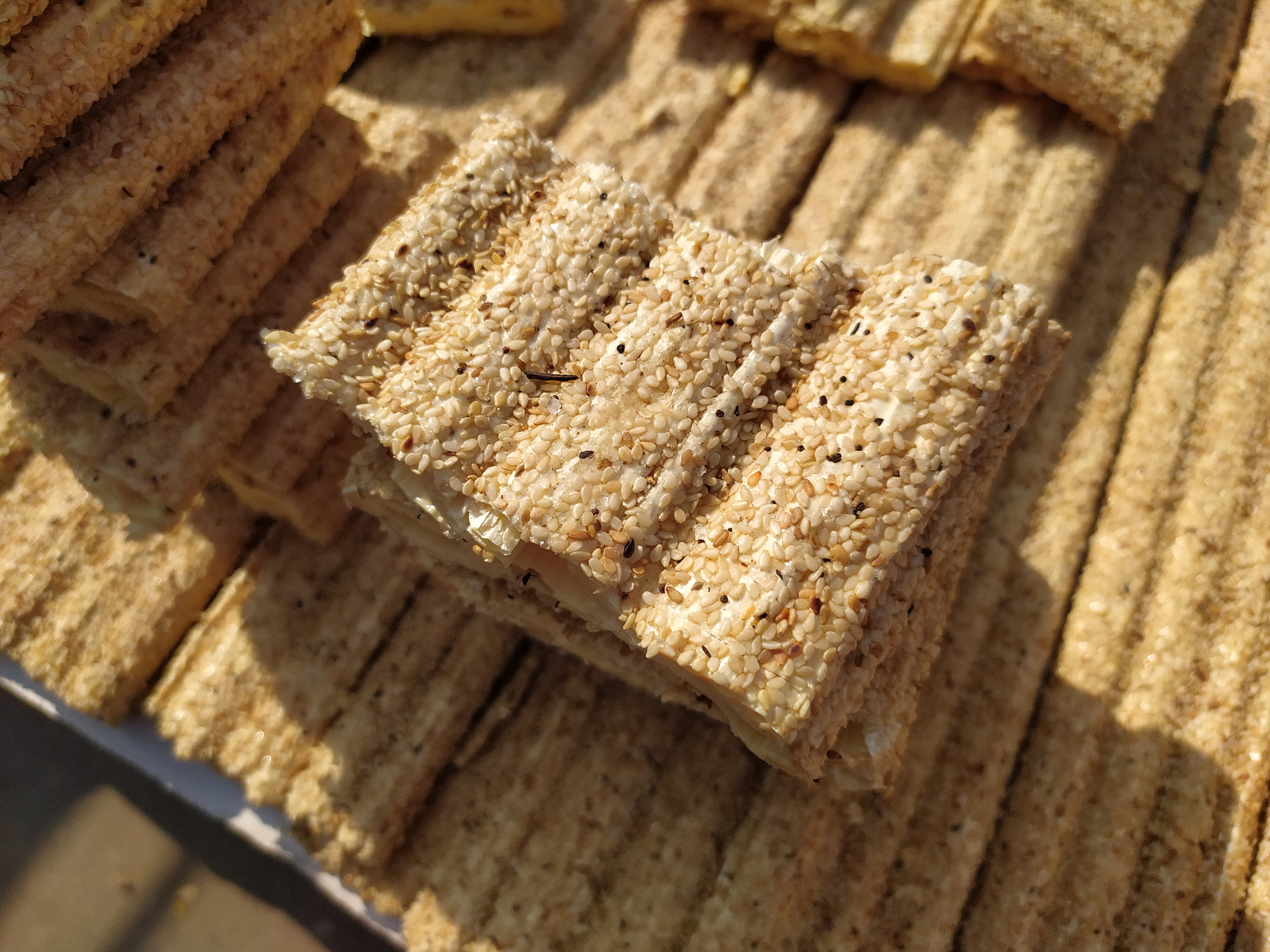
- Sliced Sesame Seed Candy
- Type: Snacks
- Course: Confectionery
- Place of origin: Kushtia, Bangladesh
- Region or state: Bengal
- Associated cuisine: Bangladeshi
- Created by: Teli community of Kushtia
- Main ingredients: Sugar, Sesame

Sesame Seed Candy or Tiler Khaja (Bengali: তিলের খাজা) is a type of confectionery made from sesame seeds produced in Kushtia District of Bangladesh which is well known to the people of the country including Kushtia. The shape of this confectionery is flattened and oblong. Peeled sesame seeds are spread on it and the inside is slightly hollow.

== Origin ==
There are some theories about the origins of this famous confectionery from Kushtia. According to history, this item appeared in Kushtia in East Bengal while India was undivided. The locals of Kushtia refer to the Teli community as the inventors of this confectionery.

In 1971, a factory at Charmilpara, Kushtia that produces Tiler Khaja was opened.

== Ingredients ==
Ingredients for Tiler Khaja are:

- Sugar
- Sesame
- Milk
- Cardamom
- Water

== Recipe ==
First, sugar, water, milk, etc. are boiled in a pan for ten to twelve minutes. In this way the sugar will melt and mix with other ingredients. This hot mixture or pure sugar is then poured out of the pot to cool. When it cools down, the sticky sugar mixture or paste is lifted and tied in a loop. Usually after a few minutes the two of them complete the process of pulling and lengthening this adhesive mixture. This causes the inside to swell and the color to turn white.

== See also ==
- Zaotang
