= Từ hôm nay (Feel Like Ooh) =

Single by Chi Pu
- Released: October 10, 2017
- Genre: Electropop
- Length: 3:15
- Label: GOM Entertainment
- Songwriters: Krazy Park; Eddy S. Park; Trang Pháp
- Producers: Krazy Park; Eddy S. Park

Chi Pu singles chronology
"Fighting Fighting" (2016)	"Từ hôm nay (Feel Like Ooh)" (2017)	"Cho ta gần hơn (I'm in Love)" (2017)

"Từ hôm nay (Feel Like Ooh)" (English: "From now on") is a song recorded by Vietnamese model and actor Chi Pu, written and produced by South Korean musicians Krazy Park and Eddy S. Park, with translation handled by singer-songwriter Trang Pháp. This K-pop-influenced electropop track served as the first official single launching its performer's career as a recording artist.

On October 10, 2017, "Từ hôm nay (Feel Like Ooh)" was released via Chi Pu's self-established label GOM Entertainment. However, it quickly drew negative reception from the public, which was mostly aimed at the performer's limited vocal abilities and Trang Pháp's lyrical work. Chi Pu's decision to pursue a singing career also created a controversial debate among celebrities, attracting various opinions from artists such as Hương Tràm and Lam Trường. Further criticisms went to the song's accompanying music video for being disjointed in content, and eventually, it became that year's most-disliked V-pop video on YouTube.

The track's Korean version, titled "Ijebuteo", was later included in Chi Pu's debut extended play Love Story (2017). While her live performances were panned for weak vocals, cover versions from Trung Quân and Trọng Hiếu received a more-favorable reception. The latter's rendition was also released as a single in January 2018.

== Background and composition ==
"Từ hôm nay (Feel Like Ooh)"
A sample of the song's chorus, where it had the vocals of its performer laid on a combination of acoustic guitar and electronic sounds. It also carried signature elements of K-pop.

In October 2017, model-actress Chi Pu announced that she was pursuing a career in music, with a web series documenting the process. Two South Korean musicians, Krazy Park and Eddy S. Park, were recruited to join the project after they were introduced to the singer by one of her close friends. They later wrote and produced two songs, "Từ hôm nay (Feel Like Ooh)" and "Cho ta gần hơn (I'm in Love)". Chi Pu eventually decided to release the former track first on October 10, declaring it the project's "warm-up" single.

"Từ hôm nay (Feel Like Ooh)" is an electropop track that was influenced by K-pop, EDM and country music. According to the press release, its production was a combination of acoustic guitar and electronic sounds. The lyrics see the performer trying to get over a breakup, and some details can be interpreted as her ambition for future recognition as a singer. Vietnamese musician Trang Pháp worked on the song's translated lyrics, although Krazy Park and Eddy S. Park stated that the job would be difficult due to its K-pop-influenced musical styling. They were, however, eventually pleased with Trang Pháp's final product.

Women's publication, Phụ Nữ, noted an excessive use of Auto-Tune on the singer's vocals throughout the track; while various parts of Chi Pu singing "oh oh oh oh" were jokingly compared by many reviewers to sounds made by a rooster. Due to this comparison, the singer subsequently displayed the animal's imagery or referred to it in several of her music videos and her performance at the V Live Awards in January 2018.

Chi Pu recorded "Từ hôm nay (Feel Like Ooh)" and "Cho ta gần hơn (I'm in Love)" in two days in South Korea. The former track's Korean version, titled "Ijebuteo" (Korean: 이제부터), was included in her extended play, Love Story, which was released exclusively in South Korea. A version with altered Vietnamese lyrics later served for her endorsement for e-commerce website Tiki in December of that year.

== Reception ==
=== Critical reviews ===
Upon its release, "Từ hôm nay (Feel Like Ooh)" received polarizing—but mostly negative—reactions from reviewers and audiences. Multiple publications regarded the song as "disastrous", including VnExpress, which also called it "bland" and "unoriginal". Zing observed that although the singer was adapting a manufactured pop style, her vocal abilities did not meet the material's expectation. "Chi Pu could not do the most important job of a singer: singing", wrote a contributor of Phụ Nữ who likened her singing voice to an auto-tune "machine" and criticized the production for sounding "a decade old". Tuổi Trẻ Online later published a review based on a variety of opinions from the audience. In it, they expressed skepticism of the originality of her future releases and commented on her performance: "Chi Pu's vocal is not bad, but it's as flat as a soulless sound created by a computer."

"Find a place where love leads to / Why should I be sad when it's over? / Where to run to when the rain is coming? / The confusion in my heart troubled me" was cited by Phụ Nữ and Zing as an example of Trang Pháp's "nonsense" lyrics in the song. "Accepting the fact that EDM tracks do not usually require much depth to their lyrical content, [...] the line above is rubbish and meaningless," the former publication continued. Zing also pointed out that having been translated from Korean to Vietnamese had affected the meaning and some of the pronunciations in the song. Thể thao & Văn hóa agreed; they found Chi Pu's singing "acceptable" but faulted Trang Pháp's "clumsy" translation for being one of the main factors that failed the song as a whole.

In contrast, Người Đưa Tin thought the song was not that "disastrous", as Chi Pu only needed time to improve. Tiền Phong compared the singer to Sơn Tùng M-TP in 2013, suggesting that despite initial negative reactions from the public, she would eventually succeed. The same comparison was made by another writer from Zing, who felt the public were too quick to judge her and called the singer's decision to follow a music career "brave". Both Lao Động and Tuổi Trẻ Online went on to say that regardless of some technical errors, some audience still found "Từ hôm nay (Feel Like Ooh)", indeed, "catchy". Its Korean version, released afterwards, was also panned as many criticized her pronunciation and questioned her decision to enter the K-pop music market.

"Từ hôm nay (Feel Like Ooh)" was shortlisted for Best Dance/Electronic Song category at the Zing Music Awards in January 2018, but was not nominated.

=== Celebrity reaction ===
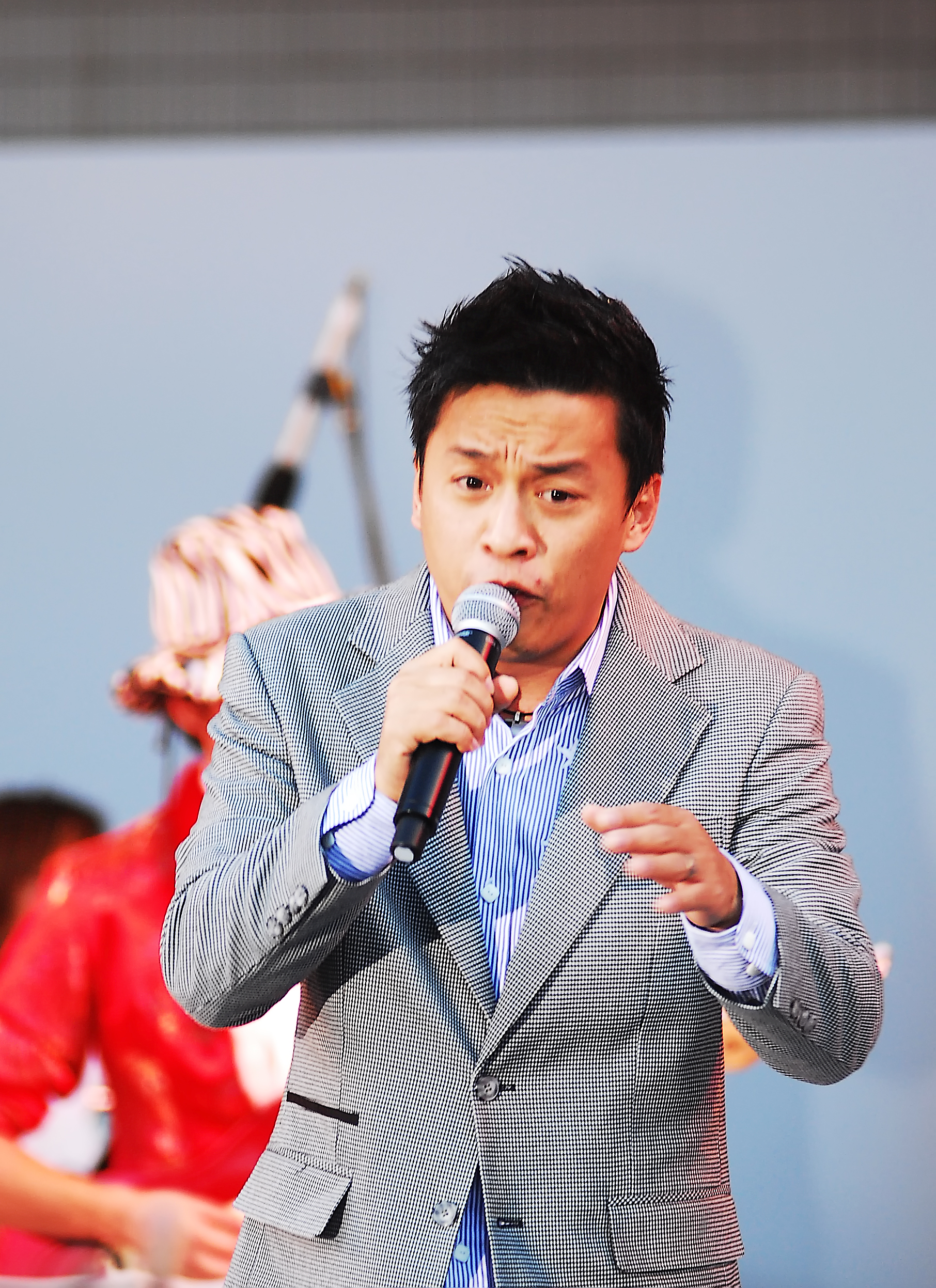
Celebrities were divided on Chi Pu's decision to pursue a music career. Hương Tràm (left) was the most vocal in criticizing the singer while Lam Trường (right) was among those who were supportive

Notable performers have since voiced their disapproval of the track and Chi Pu's motive to become a singer, including Thanh Lam, Mỹ Linh, Thu Minh, Tóc Tiên, Uyên Linh, Hương Tràm, Quốc Thiên and Văn Mai Hương. Hương personally felt it was an "insult" toward "true artists" like herself.

The most vocal of the group was Hương Tràm, who repeatedly attacked Chi Pu on social media and claimed the singer was trying to financially "exploit" fans with her newly started music venture. "I initially thought I was wrong [for criticizing Chi Pu]," she stated. "However, I think people will realize someday that if they were straightforward like me from the start, together they could have stopped something that should not have happened." Chi Pu later responded to the singer's comments during a press conference, saying: "If [her comments] were more civilized and less prejudiced, I would have had listened to them."

Văn Mai Hương, who received death threats from Chi Pu's fans following her opinion, explained that she only disagreed with the singer's comment: (literal translation) "In Vietnam, if you hold a microphone, you're a singer." This statement first sparked outrage as it was taken out of context and misunderstood as "you only have to hold a microphone to become a singer." Chi Pu's full statement actually read: "In South Korea, if you hold a microphone and sing, you can become different types of artists like a vocalist or an idol. But in Vietnam, if you hold a microphone, you have to be a vocalist. (Note: "Ca sĩ" in Vietnamese is a general term for "singer" and "vocalist.") There's no other term coined for an artist that relied on performing [like me]."

Minh Quân also received an immediate backlash for implying that the Agency for Performing Arts should have banned Chi Pu from becoming a singer. Lam Trường directly responded to this by saying that the decision accepting Chi Pu should solely be made by the audience. Lê Minh Tuấn, Agency for Performing Arts' deputy manager, said that there was "not enough basis" to suspend the singer and gave similar comments to Lam Trường's. Soon after the incident, Minh Quân denied that his statement was about Chi Pu.

In addition to Lam Trường, other artists such as Thanh Hà, Phi Nhung, Huỳnh Nhật Tân, Noo Phước Thịnh, WePro Entertainment's CEO Quang Huy and his wife Phạm Quỳnh Anh, Minh Hằng, Phương Vy, Phạm Hoài Nam, Erik, and Chi Pu's former boyfriend Cường Seven, defended the singer. They joined several media outlets in opposing overly-disparaging remarks that were made by artists such as Hương Tràm, which Thanh Hà called "taboo" and "foolish". Noo Phước Thịnh and Minh Hằng expressed sympathy toward Chi Pu as they also had their starts in modelling and acting before gaining fame as recording artists.

== Music video ==
Among criticisms of the video's inconsistency, this scene where Chi Pu is seen dancing was singled out by critics for being "confusing" and having poor visual effects

The music video for "Từ hôm nay (Feel Like Ooh)" marked the third collaboration of Chi Pu and director Khương Vũ. It was shot in 26 hours, follows a similar concept to music videos of K-pop, and features the singer in six different outfits from fashion houses such as Gucci, Givenchy and Moschino. One billion VND (US$44,000) was spent for clothing in the four music videos, and half of those costumes appeared on this clip. According to Chi Pu, the song's lyrical context served as the basis for the video's narrative, with both depicting a young woman wanting to make a positive change in her life after a failed relationship.

The clip shows the singer: performing in front of a house set upon pink-colored clouds and with multiple versions of herself in front of large golden cut-outs; appearing in a fish tank with toys; standing next to a mannequin which has flowers placed on its head; wearing red outfits coordinated with her dancers; and sitting on and dancing in front of a stone throne. In many shots, the singer is backed by various brightly colored and animated graphics, some via a green screen and some via a large LED display. Her stylist, Hoàng Ku, was meant to substitute for the mannequin in the video, but the idea was scrapped. Chi Pu later shared that being filmed in a fish tank filled with cold water was the most-difficult scene to shoot, and explained that the last scene, where she sits on a throne, was meant to represent women as "the most powerful and the queens of the world."

Although many reviewers appreciated the video's production values, most dismissed the final product as a "confusing" patchwork. Zing noticed the singer's transition to a more-mature image, but thought that the video's message appeared to be "vague", and further criticized its "flashiness" and its lack of consistency. Phụ Nữ agreed, labelled it as a "dated" K-pop video with poorly-done visual effects. Both critics and VnExpress' other negative opinions targeted the choreography, the "out of style" fashion and a few particular scenes, including one where the singer improvised her dance moves, her appearance in the fish tank and the usage of LED backgrounds. In December, the clip was reported to be 2017's most-disliked V-pop music video on YouTube with 260,000 dislikes, since its release on October 10. It was later shortlisted for Music Video of the Year category at the Zing Music Awards in January 2018.

== Live performances and cover versions ==
Chi Pu performed the track live for the first time at a press conference conducted for the release of "Cho ta gần hơn (I'm in Love)", dubbed as "Dream Show – Cho ta gần hơn," on October 27, 2017; and later during her appearance on talk show, Bữa trưa vui vẻ, on November 19. Both performances, however, received universally negative reactions wherein Chi Pu's vocals were cited for being weak and often breathless.

Trung Quân later released a jazz rendition of the track on November 12, while Trọng Hiếu performed a new EDM mix—produced by SlimV—on January 12, 2018, during an episode of the Vietnamese version of Celebrity Battle. The new versions were praised for their arrangements, and the latter was released as a single four days after its televised debut.

== Track listing and format ==
Online streaming
No.	Title	Length
1.	"Từ hôm nay (Feel Like Ooh)"	3:15
2.	"Từ hôm nay (Feel Like Ooh)" (instrumental)	3:15
Total length:		6:30

== Credits ==
Credits adapted from Melon and "Từ hôm nay (Feel Like Ooh)" music video's closing credits.

Recording and management

- Mixed at Krazy Studio and Eyaki Studio (Seoul, South Korea)
- Mastered at 821 Sound Studio (Seoul, South Korea)
- Published by NHN Bugs Corporation

Personnel

- Chi Pu – lead vocals, executive production
- Krazy Park (Park Hyun Joong) – writing, production, arrangement
- Eddy S. Park (Park Deogsang) – writing, production, arrangement
- Trang Pháp – writing (Vietnamese)
- Huỳnh Hiển Năng – recording engineering
- Choi Hyung – mixing engineering
- Kwon Nam Woo – mastering engineering
- Noh Kyung Hwan – guitar
- Nguyễn Hữu Anh – executive production
- Bora Hương – project coordination
