= Year-End Gathering =

Vietnamese television series

- A scene from Gặp nhau cuối năm in 2016
- Creative directors: Đỗ Thanh Hải; Nguyễn Khải Hưng
- Presented by: Thảo Vân
- Starring: Quốc Khánh; Xuân Bắc; Công Lý; Vân Dung; Tự Long; Quang Thắng; Chí Trung; Minh Hằng; Nguyễn Hà Trung; Đỗ Duy Nam
- Country of origin: Vietnam
- No. of episodes: 22

Production
- Producer: Vietnam Television Film Center (VFC)
- Running time: 90–150 minutes (TV edit); 90–200 minutes (streaming edit)

Original release
- Network: Vietnam Television (VTV)
- Release: 31 January 2003 – 28 January 2025

Gặp nhau cuối năm (transl. Year-End Gathering), commonly known as Táo Quân, is a Vietnamese annual satirical comedy program broadcast across all channels of Vietnam Television (VTV) at Tết, and produced by the Vietnam Television Film Center (VFC) since 2003, with several interruptions. Known for its comedic take on the socio-political and economic issues of the year in Vietnam, the show is considered a television staple of the Vietnamese New Year holiday. It features some of the biggest names of Vietnamese comedy, including Quốc Khánh, Vân Dung, Quang Thắng, Tự Long, Công Lý, and Xuân Bắc.

== History ==
Gặp nhau cuối năm has been produced by the Vietnam Television Film Center since 2003. The show was originally produced as a special Lunar New Year episode of VTV's former comedy show Gặp nhau cuối tuần (Weekend Get-together). Gặp nhau cuối năm became a separate program in 2006.

On 22 November 2019, VTV and VFC confirmed that they would put the Táo Quân version of Gặp nhau cuối năm on hold. The 2020 edition of Gặp nhau cuối năm, loosely based on the 1982 film Làng Vũ Đại ngày ấy (Once Upon a Time in Vũ Đại Village) and features characters from famous Vietnamese literary works, was not well received by the public, who expressed the desire for the Táo Quân version to return.

On 11 January 2021, VTV and VFC announced the return of the Táo Quân version of Gặp nhau cuối năm, starting in 2021. On 7 January 2026, VTV announced another suspension of the Táo Quân version, filling its time slot with a special program titled Quảng trường mùa xuân (Spring Square).

== Premise ==
The show is mainly set in Heaven, where Ngọc Hoàng rules. He has two assistants, the gods Nam Tào and Bắc Đẩu (named after the two star constellations Crux and Big Dipper) who helps him manage affairs of the earthly kingdom. There are a few other characters off-handedly mentioned, but usually only Thiên Lôi (God of Thunder) is on-screen and often has to run Heaven's errands.

Every year, Ngọc Hoàng assembles the Táo Quân(s) (Kitchen Gods) to Heaven to report the affairs in Vietnam throughout the year to him. Unlike the original legend, there could be multiple Táo(s), each in charge of one aspect of the country's society (such as transportation, economy, education, culture or tourism, but no politics, military or defense). The Táo(s) are typically named after the division they are in charge of, although in 2015 they are named after the Five Elementals (Wuxing).

Táo(s) report directly to Ngọc Hoàng with the presence of Nam Tào and Bắc Đẩu, who often find faults in their reports and run into arguments. Ngọc Hoàng typically hears the stories and makes comments, but can be sarcastic and show unexpected talents and remarks. Although the majority of reports are done by prose, sometimes the reports can be told by other forms, such as dancing, singing or short plays. The reports highlight the socio-political and economic issues of the past year in Vietnam, often interpreted in a more comedic and light-hearted manner.

At the end of the assembly, all of the Táo(s) gather, and Ngọc Hoàng reads the final remarks. The show ends with the cast and presenter Thảo Vân (absent in 2022) wishing audiences a happy new year.

Starting from 2009, in addition to the main plot, the show also includes an accompanying theme and scenario.

- In 2009, the Táo Quân(s) presented Hoa Táo, a parody of the beauty competition Miss Vietnam.
- In 2011, the show was named Táo Idol with the format based on Vietnam Idol.
- In 2013, the show was based on the format of The Voice of Vietnam. In addition, Ngọc Hoàng, Nam Tào and Bắc Đẩu switched bodies by order, unbeknownst to the Táo Quân(s).
- In 2014, Ngọc Hoàng had a sore throat and could not attend the assembly. Nam Tào and Bắc Đẩu was forced to find a lookalike, Tèo (also played by Quốc Khánh) and trained him to act as a temporary replacement for Ngọc Hoàng.
- In 2015, the later part of the show featured a competition where Ngọc Hoàng requested to find a third sidekick in the zenith for him, alongside Nam Tào and Bắc Đẩu. This part was based on the television game shows Ai là triệu phú (the Vietnamese adaptation of Who Wants to Be a Millionaire?) and Ơn giời cậu đây rồi (the Vietnamese adaptation of Thank God You're Here).
- In 2016, the later part of the show featured a wheel from Chiếc nón kỳ diệu (the Vietnamese adaptation of Wheel of Fortune) to find out which Táo is responsible for corruption.
- In 2018, the show marked its 15th anniversary, but the reporting part was removed. Instead, this year's show featured a catwalk runway and a competition to win the title of "the first quintessence Táo".
- In 2023, the show marked its 20th anniversary. This year's programme does not have a reporting section of the Táo(s), with them instead participating in a contest called "Táo bạo", a parody of Miss Vietnam.

=== Musical performances ===
The show frequently features music and dance performances throughout. Although the settings and costumes are based on the imperial era, the singers (and at times the actors themselves) can change to a more contemporary look, if necessary. The show also frequently parodies Vietnamese and foreign songs, by rewriting the lyrics for storytelling purposes. Many performances later become Internet memes in Vietnam. The incomplete list includes:

Year	Song	Original artist
2007	"A Man of Determination"	George Lam
2007	"Hips Don't Lie"	Shakira, Wyclef Jean
2008	"Million Roses"	Alla Pugacheva
2009	"Money, Money, Money"	ABBA
2009	"Đêm buồn tỉnh lẻ"	
2009	"Từ một ngã tư đường phố"	Phạm Tuyên
2009	"...Baby One More Time"	Britney Spears
2010	"I Have a Dream"	ABBA
2010	"Daddy Cool"	Boney M.
2010	"Bèo dạt mây trôi"	
2011	"Tôi người lái xe"	
2011	"Un-Break My Heart"	Toni Braxton
2011	"Teen vọng cổ"	Vĩnh Thuyên Kim
2011	"Cháu lên ba"	
2011	"Đi học"	
2012	"Xin lỗi tình yêu"	Đàm Vĩnh Hưng
2012	"Ly cà phê Ban Mê"	Siu Black
2012	"The Bund"	Frances Yip
2012	"Cô gái vót chông"	Anh Thơ
2012	"Đường cong"	Thu Minh
2012	"Chia tay hoàng hôn"	Thanh Lam
2012	"Vì một thế giới ngày mai"	Nguyễn Quang Vinh
2013	"Là con gái thật tuyệt"	Khởi My
2013	"Gangnam Style"	Psy
2013	"Nắng có còn xuân"	
2013	"Чему учат в школе"	
2013	"Áo trắng đến trường"	
2013	"Chiếc khăn piêu"	Tùng Dương
2013	"Lý kéo chài"	
2013	"Chị tôi"	Trần Tiến
2014	"Trái tim không ngủ yên"	Bằng Kiều, Mỹ Linh
2014	"Hoa sữa"	Thanh Lam
2014	"Rock xuyên màn đêm"	Bức Tường
2014	"Chào em cô gái Lam Hồng"	
2014	"Sắc màu"	Trần Thu Hà
2014	"Vì em quá yêu anh"	Mỹ Tâm
2014	"Không cảm xúc"	Hồ Quang Hiếu
2014	"Con bướm xinh"	Hồ Quang Hiếu
2014	"Nơi tình yêu bắt đầu"	Tiến Minh
2015	"Nắm lấy tay anh"	Tuấn Hưng
2015	"Không phải dạng vừa đâu"	Sơn Tùng M-TP
2015	"Cảm ơn tình yêu"	Uyên Linh
2016	"Em là hoa hồng nhỏ"	Trịnh Công Sơn
2016	"Vợ người ta"	Phan Mạnh Quỳnh
2016	"Ngõ vắng xôn xao"	Trần Quang Huy
2016	"Mình đi đâu thế"	Hoàng Bách
2017	"Hoa trinh nữ"	
2017	"Mắt nai cha cha"	Hồng Ngọc
2017	"Thành phố trẻ"	Trần Tiến
2018	"Tàu anh qua núi"	Anh Thơ
2018	"Đội kèn tí hon"	
2018	"Cho con"	
2018	"Thật bất ngờ"	Trúc Nhân
2019	"Tình ca Tây Bắc"	
2019	"Nơi này có anh"	Sơn Tùng M-TP
2019	"Con đường xưa em đi"	
2019	"Thói đời"	
2019	"Không dám đâu"	
2021	"Bigcityboi"	Binz
2021	"Có chàng trai viết lên cây"	Phan Mạnh Quỳnh
2022	"One Way Ticket"	Neil Sedaka
2023	"Bên trên tầng lầu"	Tăng Duy Tân
2025	"Tái sinh"	Tùng Dương
2025	"Có không giữ, mất đừng tìm"	Trúc Nhân

== Cast ==
The cast of Táo Quân is composed of numerous comedians and actors from northern Vietnam. For most of the show's run, Quốc Khánh (as Ngọc Hoàng), Xuân Bắc (as Nam Tào) and Công Lý (as Bắc Đẩu) are the regulars. The remaining Táo roles are played by various actors and actresses.

=== Regular roles ===
- Quốc Khánh as Ngọc Hoàng (2004–present): ruler of Heaven. Every year, he listens to reports from the Táo Quân(s) on matters down on Earth (Vietnam). He cares for the common people and is focused on proposing ways to improve their life and well-being. He sometimes can be childish or flirtatious.
- Công Lý as Bắc Đẩu (2003–2021, 2023): Ngọc Hoàng's assistant alongside Nam Tào. Công Lý's character has been described as genderfluid, LGBT, or a drag queen. They have a softer personality than Nam Tào, although on reporting matters they can be sharp and critical. They often quarrel with Nam Tào on various issues; however, both Nam Tào and Bắc Đẩu generally work well with each other. They respect Ngọc Hoàng, but sometimes speak ill behind his back. Công Lý departed the show for health reasons in 2022, with Trung Ruồi taking over the role for that year. Công Lý returned to the role in 2023 in a guest capacity.
- Xuân Bắc as Nam Tào (2003–2021, 2023): Ngọc Hoàng's assistant alongside Bắc Đẩu. He is not afraid of harsh statements towards the Táo(s) in their reports, although he is prone to corruption and has accepted bribery from the Táo(s) multiple times. Đỗ Duy Nam took over the role in 2022 and 2024.

=== Recurring roles ===
Since the roles of Táo change every year, the following list goes by actor.

- Vân Dung (2003–present): she alternates in different years between Táo Y tế (Healthcare) and Táo Giáo dục (Education).
- Quang Thắng (2003–present): often enters with a grand entrance. He assumes the role of Táo Kinh tế (Economy) in most years, although in some years he plays the role of Táo Giáo dục (Education).
- Chí Trung (2005–present): he generally takes the role of Táo Giao thông (Transportation) or any role that has the most controversial issues of the year. According to actor Tự Long, Chi Trung is the person who has many of the best quotes on the show.
- Tự Long (2003–present): a comedian originated from chèo, hence his acts often incorporate songs and performances. He assumes the role of Táo Văn hoá (Culture) in most years.
- Đỗ Duy Nam (2014, 2017–present): He has taken on the role of Nam Tào's assistant since 2018, except for 2022, when he got the starring role of Nam Tào due to Xuân Bắc's absence.
- Trung Ruồi (2017–present): Joining the recurring cast alongside Đỗ Duy Nam, he has since taken on the role of Bắc Đẩu's assistant, except for 2022, when he took over the main role of Bắc Đẩu due to Công Lý's absence.

=== Non-frequent appearances ===
- Quốc Trượng (as Ngọc Hoàng) (2003)
- Minh Hằng: (2005–2007, 2009, 2012–2013, 2015, 2018)
- Minh Vượng (2004–2008, 2018)
- Thành Trung (2007–2014, 2023)
- Thu Hương (2003)
- Hiệp Gà (2004, 2007, 2009–2011): play the role of Gia Cát Dự. He claims to be a descendant of Zhuge Liang at his divine power of prediction, although he usually predicts everything wrong. In 2011, he took on the role of Táo Quy hoạch (City planner).
- Phạm Bằng (2005–2006)
- Anh Tuấn (2009)
- Bá Anh (2007–2008)
- Văn Hiệp (2006)
- Quốc Quân (2004, 2006, 2012)
- Bình Trọng (2006, 2008–2009, 2011–2012)
- Đức Hải (2010)
- Đức Khuê (2010)
- Lâm Vỹ Dạ (2021)
- Mạnh Hưng (2021)
- Minh Tít (2017 - 2018)
- Mạnh Dũng (2016–present)

=== Supporting roles ===
Every year, the show features other celebrities and comedians playing supporting characters. The supporting cast are listed below in order of year of appearance:

- Tiến Quang (2003, 2005–2006)
- Phú Đôn (2003–2004)
- Giang Còi (2003, 2005)
- Bình Trọng (as Thiên Lôi, the God of Thunder) (2006, 2008 - 2009, 2011 - 2012)
- Hoàng Sơn (2006)
- Mai Sơn (2006)
- Viết Thái (2006)
- Tạ Am (2006)
- Nhật Cường (2006)
- Thế Anh (2007)
- Chiến Thắng (2007)
- Hải Anh (2008)
- Phan Anh (2011)
- Kiên Trung (2011, 2014)
- Quốc Anh (2012)
- Minh Quân (2013–2016, 2018, 2023)
- Việt Bắc (2014, 2018, 2021–2022)
- Tiến Minh (2014, 2021, 2023)
- Chí Tài (2015)
- Việt Hương (2015)
- Tuấn Hưng (2015)
- Bình Minh (2016)
- Quân Anh (2016–18)
- Xuân Bắc's sons (2018)
- Đức Hùng (fashion designer) (2018, 2023)
- Lan Hương (2019)
- Thái Dương (2022 -)
- Thanh Dương (2023)

=== Timeline of actors/actresses ===
Legend
Featured as a main character.
Featured as a supporting character.

Name of celebrity	1 (2003)	2 (2004)	3 (2005)	4 (2006)	5 (2007)	6 (2008)	7 (2009)	8 (2010)	9 (2011)	10 (2012)	11 (2013)	12 (2014)	13 (2015)	14 (2016)	15 (2017)	16 (2018)	17 (2019)	New version (2020)	18 (2021)	19 (2022)	20 (2023)	21 (2024)
Thảo Vân	Host																					Host
Quốc Khánh		Ngọc Hoàng										Ngọc Hoàng / Tèo (car valet)	Ngọc Hoàng					Lão Hạc	Ngọc Hoàng			
Xuân Bắc	Nam Tào																	Xuân Tóc Đỏ	Nam Tào		Nam Tào	
Công Lý	Bắc Đẩu																		Bắc Đẩu		Bắc Đẩu	
Quang Thắng	Táo Quân	Táo Quốc lộ (Highway)	Táo Giáo dục (Education)		Táo Giao thông (Transportation)	Táo Quy hoạch (City Planning)	Táo Kinh tế (Economy)	Táo Tiền Vàng (Gold & Money)	Táo Kinh tế (Economy)				Táo Hoả (Fire)	Táo Kinh tế (Economy)	Táo Kinh Công (Economy-Industry & Trade)	Táo Kinh tế (Economy)	Táo Kinh tế (Economy)	Lộ Mõ	Táo Kinh tế (Economy)	Táo Kinh tế (Economy)	Táo Kinh tế (Economy)	
Tự Long	Supporting role	Táo Hải sản (Seafood)	Miss De Jang-geum	Táo Thể thao (Sports)		Taxi driver / fake foreigner	Táo Thoát nước (Drainage)	Táo Giáo dục (Education)	Táo Văn hoá – Xã hội (Culture & Society)	Táo Thể thao (Sports)	Thổ địa	Táo Giao thông (Transportation)	Táo Mộc (Wood)	Táo Tinh thần (Morale)	Táo Môi trường (Environment)	Táo Xã hội (Society)	Táo Giao thông (Transportation)	Nô (Noo Phúc Thọ)	Táo Xã hội (Society)	Táo Mạng (Internet)	Táo Xã hội (Society)	
Vân Dung	Táo Xã hội (Society)	Táo Dược phẩm (Pharmacy)	Táo Y tế (Healthcare)		Táo Kinh tế (Economy)	Táo Báo chí (Journalism)	Táo Tiêu dùng (Consumption)	Táo Cộng đồng (Community)	Táo Điện lực (Electricity)	Táo Y tế (Healthcare)	Táo Dân sinh (Livelihood)	Táo Y tế (Healthcare)	Táo Thuỷ (Water)	Táo Giáo dục (Education)		Táo Y tế (Healthcare)	Táo Xã hội (Society)	Thị Mầu	Táo Y tế (Healthcare)	Táo Xã hội (Society)	Táo Y Tế (Healthcare)	
Chí Trung			Táo Giao thông (Transportation)	Táo Xây dựng (Construction)	Táo Quan chức (Officials)	Táo Giao thông (Transportation)						Táo Điện lực (Electricity)	Táo Thổ (Earth)	Táo Xã hội (Society)	Táo Công chức (Officials)	Táo Quy hoạch (City Planning)	Táo Giáo dục (Education)	Ngàn Like	Táo Giáo dục (Education)	Táo Giao thông (Transportation)		
Đỗ Duy Nam												Poor civilian			Phó Thiên Lôi (Vice Thunder Guard)	Phó Thiên Lôi (Vice Thunder Guard)	Phó Thiên Lôi (Vice Thunder Guard)	Like's assistant	Phó Thiên Lôi (Vice Thunder Guard)	Nam Tào	Trợ Lý Bắc Đẩu (Bắc Đẩu’s assistant)	
Trung Ruồi															Phó Thiên Lôi (Vice Thunder Guard)	Phó Thiên Lôi (Vice Thunder Guard)	Phó Thiên Lôi (Vice Thunder Guard)	Like's assistant	Phó Thiên Lôi (Vice Thunder Guard)	Bắc Đẩu	Trợ Lý Bắc Đẩu (Bắc Đẩu’s assistant)	
Minh Hằng			Mama Choi (Mama Chuê)	Táo Đầu tư (Investment)	Táo Văn hoá (Culture)		Táo Điện lực (Electricity)			Táo Giáo dục (Education)	Táo Văn thể (Culture-Sport)		Táo Kim (Metal)			Táo Môi trường (Environment)						
Phạm Bằng			Táo Văn nghệ (Art)	Táo Tài nguyên (Natural Resources)																		
Quốc Trượng	Ngọc Hoàng																					
Thu Hương	Táo Văn hóa (Culture)																					
Văn Hiệp			Supporting role	Táo Công nghiệp (Industry)																		
Minh Vượng		Supporting role		Táo Kinh tế (Economy)	Táo Cơ chế (System)	Táo Đời sống (Life)										Táo Hưu trí (Retirement)						
Đức Khuê								Táo Dân sinh (Livelihood)														
Đức Hải								Táo Thực phẩm (Food)														
Quốc Quân		Táo Giáo dục (Education)		Supporting role						Supporting role												
Bá Anh					Táo Giáo dục (Education)	Táo Kinh tế (Economy)																
Hồ Liên												Táo Giáo dục (Education)										
Thành Trung					Táo Y tế (Healthcare)		Táo Nông dân (Farmer)	Táo Quy hoạch (City Planning)	Thiên Lôi's relative	Táo Điện lực (Electricity)	Supporting role									Táo Quy Hoạch (City Planning)		
Anh Tuấn							Táo Y tế (Healthcare)															
Diễm Hương												Táo Văn hoá (Culture)										
Hiệp Gà		Supporting role			Táo Blog		Gia Cát Dự		Táo Quy hoạch (City Planning)													
Xuân Hinh																		Chí Phèo				
Thanh Thanh Hiền																		Phó Đoan				
Lâm Vỹ Dạ																			Humanoid robot (modeled after Bắc Đẩu)			

== Episodes ==
=== Lunar New Years ===
Edition	Air date	Notes
1	31 January 2003	First edition of the Táo Quân version
2	21 January 2004	
3	8 February 2005	
4	28 January 2006	
5	16 February 2007	
6	6 February 2008	
7	25 January 2009	
8	13 February 2010	
9	2 February 2011	
10	22 January 2012	
11	9 February 2013	Special edition, 10th anniversary
12	30 January 2014	
13	18 February 2015	
14	7 February 2016	
15	27 January 2017	
16	15 February 2018	Special edition, 15th anniversary
17	4 February 2019	
18	24 January 2020	A version, aired only in 2020
19	11 February 2021	
20	31 January 2022	
21	21 January 2023	Special edition, 20th anniversary
22	9 February 2024	
23	28 January 2025	

=== International New Years ===
Episode number	Air date	Notes
A	31 December 2006	First episode
B	31 December 2007	Last episode

== Filming and broadcasting ==
The show is broadcast across all of VTV's channels on Vietnamese New Year's Eve every year since its inception. From 2003 to 2005, and in 2007, Táo Quân was filmed at VTV's S9 studio, and until 2008, Kim Mã Theater was chosen as the location for filming; in 2006, 2009, 2010–2014 and 2018–2022, the show was filmed at the Vietnam-Soviet Friendship Labor Culture Palace (Vietnamese: Cung Văn hoá Lao động Hữu nghị Việt-Xô) in Hanoi. In 2015 and 2017, the show was filmed at VTV's S14 studio. In 2016, the show was filmed at VTV's S15 studio.

From 2010 to 2013, the show was released on DVD a week before the air date. The DVD version has the full recording and is usually longer and slightly different from the TV version. Since 2014, VTV ceased producing DVDs and started releasing the show digitally. The 2014 release was handled by CNC and the 2015 to 2017 release was distributed by VTV Digital (VTV Go). The 2018 show was released exclusively on VTV's multi-platform entertainment portal VTVGiaiTri.

As a result of its popularity, many other television channels have copied Táo Quân's format. On YouTube, the show has achieved more than 320 million views (this includes all editions and performances).

The actors have about two months to prepare for the show, which begins production one week before the television air date. The show is filmed for three days, then edited to fit into its two-hour broadcasting block on television (including commercials). An extended cut, typically at around three hours, is subsequently released.

As Tết is also a busy time for Vietnamese comedians, the cast often has to rehearse at nighttime, which takes a toll on their health and personal life. For instance, in 2017, Quốc Khánh (who portrays the Ngọc Hoàng) lost his mother at the time of rehearsals and had to take on responsibilities for her funeral as well as for the show. Such demanding schedule, however, does not deter big names from committing to the show.

== Controversies ==
In 2009, two performances by Táo Điện lực ("Electrical Manager") (played by Minh Hang), in which she was singing songs asking for government funding, were censored. One performance was completely removed from the broadcast and the other was replaced by a later re-recorded version with changes in its lyrics. In that same special, a verse (also about asking the government for money) from a song called "Lụt từ ngã tư đường phố" (Flood from the Crossroads) performed by Táo Thoát nước ("Drainaging Manager") was also removed from the broadcast. However, all the original uncut performances from the special were later leaked onto the internet.

In 2013, VFC and VTV were requested to censor some of the jokes that were considered offensive and inappropriate by the Department of Arts and Performance (Vietnamese: Cục Nghệ thuật Biểu diễn). As such, the DVD release for the show came four days later than planned.

In 2015, the Department of Arts and Performance asked VFC to submit the full script of the show to be reviewed before taping but the request was denied by VFC. Đỗ Thanh Hải – the show's creative director – spoke out against the department's move. To avoid censorship from the NTBD, the show had to be moved to Studio 14 of VTV, a venue that is smaller than the Vietnam-Soviet Friendship Palace of Culture and Labour (Vietnamese: Cung Văn hóa Lao động Hữu nghị Việt Xô), where the show was planned to take place.

In 2017, some of the show's jokes were censored by VTV. However, VFC later released the original cut of the show on YouTube.

In 2018, VFC and VTV were criticized for allowing several offensive jokes on the LGBT community and body shaming. The issue was met with polarized reactions but VFC and VTV gave no further comments.

In 2023, Xuân Bắc was criticized for a Facebook post on January 24 about a son who heavily criticizes his mother's handmade bánh chưng (a traditional dish in Tết), only to get a slap as a punishment for being rude. The post was believed to be a response to negative review of the show. Viewers had mixed opinions on the issue, and most of them believed that Xuân Bắc was disrespecting the viewers of the show.

== See also ==
- CCTV New Year's Gala
- Little Blue Light
