= Xuân Bắc =

Vietnamese actor, comedian and television presenter (born 1976)

People's Artist Xuan Bac
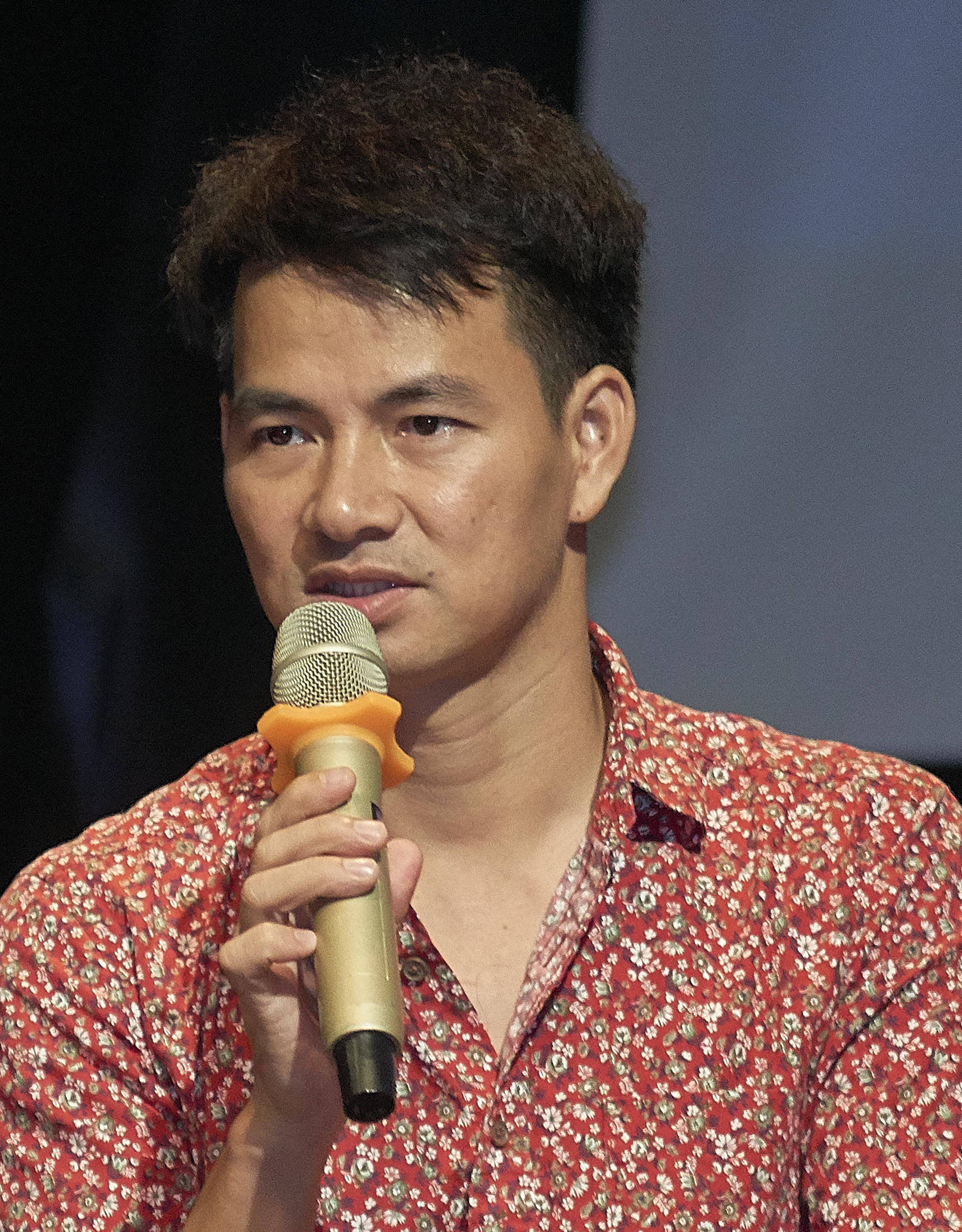
- Xuân Bắc in 2019
- Born: Nguyễn Xuân Bắc; August 21, 1976 (age 49); Viet Tri, Phu Tho, Vietnam
- Occupations: Actor; comedian; television presenter
- Years active: 1995–present
- Height: 1.68 m (5 ft 6 in)
- Title: Meritorious Artist (2015); People's Artist (2023)
- Spouse: Nguyễn Hồng Nhung
- Children: 3

Nguyễn Xuân Bắc (born August 21, 1976), known professionally as Xuân Bắc, is a Vietnamese actor, comedian and television presenter. Starting his career in 1995, he soon became known to the public and professionals with his role as Nui in the TV series Sóng ở đáy sông, and was also one of the main actors in the political comedy shows Gặp nhau cuối tuần and Gặp nhau cuối năm of Vietnam Television. Besides his acting career, he is also the host of the TV game shows Đuổi hình bắt chữ (Vietnamese version of Catchphrase) of Hanoi Television and Vua tiếng Việt of VTV3.

For his contributions to artistic activities, Xuan Bac was awarded the title of Meritorious Artist in 2015, and later became People's Artist in 2023. In 2022, he was awarded the third-class Labor Order.

== Biography ==
Xuan Bac was born in Thanh Ha street, Viet Tri ward, Phu Tho province.

From 1982 to 1987, he studied at Hoa Binh Primary School, Thanh Mieu ward, Viet Tri city.

From 1987 to 1991, he studied at Ly Tu Trong Secondary School, Thanh Mieu ward, Viet Tri city.

From 1991 to 1994, he studied at Viet Tri Industrial High School, Viet Tri city.

In 1998, he graduated from Hanoi University of Theatre and Cinema, then worked at Vietnam Drama Theater and worked as MC for some television programs. In the same year, he officially became the brand ambassador for Rejoice shampoo brand up until 2002.

In addition to being a famous actor and MC, Xuan Bac also participates in group activities. He was awarded the "Outstanding Young Face of the Capital" award in 2009 and term 2012 – 2017.

On November 30, 2010, Xuan Bac was selected as a UNICEF Goodwill Ambassador for clean water and environmental sanitation.

2012: Master's degree – major in Art Studies

2016: Graduated from Directing – University of Theater and Cinema

On January 10, 2016, Xuan Bac was awarded the title of Meritorious Artist.

In September 2016, Xuan Bac was appointed deputy director of the Vietnam Drama Theater.

From August 1, 2018, Xuan Bac was a member of the Central Council of Young Pioneers term VIII according to Decision No. 287 – QD/TWĐTN-CTTN of the Central Executive Committee of the Ho Chi Minh Communist Youth Union

On December 11, 2019, at the first meeting of the Vietnam Youth Union Committee to select personnel, Mr. Nguyen Xuan Bac was consulted to become vice president of the Vietnam Youth Union term VIII.

On January 14, 2021, Xuan Bac was appointed director of Vietnam Drama Theater.

On November 28, 2023, according to Decision 1431/QD-CTN, he was among 42 individuals awarded the title of People's Artist in the second batch in 2023.

== Theatre ==
- Bệnh sĩ (Symptoms of Pride)

== Filmography ==
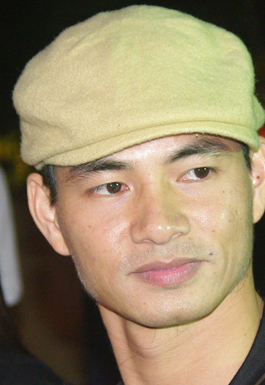
Xuan Bac in 2010

=== TV dramas ===
Year	Film	Role	Director
1995	12A và 4H (12A and 4H)	Thiện	Bùi Thạc Chuyên; Trần Quốc Trọng
1997	Ngã ba Đồng Lộc (Đồng Lộc Junction)	Thắng	Lưu Trọng Ninh
1998	Chuyện nhà Mộc (Story of Mr.Mộc's Family)	Cường	Trần Lực
1998	Kẻ cắp bất đắc dĩ (The Reluctant Thief)		Bùi Thạc Chuyên
1998	Đảo xa (The Remote Island)		
1998	Ngã ba thời gian (The Junction of Time)	A guy sues the commune chairman	Trần Phương
1999	Sóng ở đáy sông (Waves at the River Bed)	Núi	Lê Đức Tiến
1999	Nhịp tim lầm lạc (Misleading Heartbeat)		
1999	Thăng bằng (Balance)	Cường	Vũ Minh Trí
1999	Đồng quê xào xạc (Rustling Fields)		
1999	Công dân vàng (The Golden Citizen)		Nguyễn Hữu Mười
2000	Ông bầu ca nhạc (The Music Manager)		
2000	Nơi tình yêu bắt đầu (Where Love Begins)		
2001	Chuyến tắc-xi cuối cùng (Last Tap)		
2001	Chuyện ở công ty Thu Vào (Story of the Purchasing Company)		
2001	Nối lại một chân dung (Review a Portrait)	Thắng	Nguyễn Anh Dũng
2002	Miếu làng (The Village Temple)		
2002	Chuyện ngày xưa (An Old Story)		
2002	Trời cho, trò chơi (Life is Like a Joke)		
2005	Niệm khúc cuối (Last Recitation)		Nguyễn Anh Dũng
2007	Con đường sáng (The Light Road)	Đào Phúc Lộc (or Hoàng Minh Đạo)	
2012	Hai phía chân trời (Two Horizons)	Minh	Trần Quốc Trọng; Vũ Trường Khoa
2023	Lof Ba Vì – Sứ mệnh yêu thương (Love Mission)	Trạng Quỳnh	

=== Comedy videos ===
Year	Film	Role	Director
2004	Râu quặp (Council of Fear of Wife)	Sòi	Phạm Đông Hồng
2008	Tiền ơi (Oh Money)		Phạm Đông Hồng
2010	Cả Ngố (Mr.Fool)	Cả Ngố	Phạm Đông Hồng
2013	Không hề biết giận (Never Angry)	Chăm	Phạm Đông Hồng
2015	Quan trường – trường quan (Going to Academy to Become an Official)	Tý	Phạm Đông Hồng

== TV shows ==
- Gặp nhau cuối năm – VTV: Xuan Bac is always chosen to play the role of Nam Tào with his co-star Bắc Đẩu (played by Cong Ly), considered a perfect pair on stage and leaving a lot of impressions on the audience when it premieres every Tết (up until the end of 2023).
- Gặp nhau cuối tuần – VTV3: Actor.
- Gala cười – VTV: Actors.
- Weekend Relaxation (Thư giãn cuối tuần) – VTV3: Question and Answer (Hỏi Xoáy Đáp Xoay) is a part of Weekend Relaxation. In this section, Xuan Bac plays the role of MC Trần Xoáy, later promoted to Doctor, along with Professor Cù Trọng Xoay played by Đinh Tiến Dũng. Doctor Xoáy is a character who specializes in asking humorous questions to make it difficult for Professor Cu Trong Xoay and was later replaced by Mr. Xoài Trọng Chấm "." because Mr. Xoay went on a "business trip" according to the script. In 2020, the program was remade with a new name, Ask Xiên Answer Xẹo (Hỏi Xiên Đáp Xẹo).
- Đuổi hình bắt chữ – HanoiTV: Xuan Bac hosted the program for most of its broadcast time.
- Connecting hearts journey (Hành trình kết nối những trái tim) – HTV7: Xuan Bac has been with this program since the early days (around 2009). His role in this program is to comment on the situations and journeys of the characters on the pink car (LOVEBUS).
- Youth Dance (Vũ điệu tuổi xanh) – HTV7: ' In 2014, Xuan Bac participated in hosting the program Vũ Điệu Tuổi Xanh, the children's version of So You Think You Can Dance (Thử thách cùng bước nhảy).
- Do Re Mi (Đồ Rê Mí) – VTV3: Accompanying Do Re Mi since 2011, Xuan Bac played the role of a judge. In 2012, he took on the role of MC.
- Thanks god, you're here! (Ơn giời, cậu đây rồi) – VTV3: Xuan Bac hosted the program throughout its broadcast. He also performed well in leading and handling difficult situations on stage of the department heads Tran Thanh, Viet Huong and Hoài Linh.
- Dad! Where are we going? (Bố ơi, mình đi đâu thế?) – VTV3: Xuan Bac and his son Bi participated in the program Dad! Where are we going? season 2 with the father-son pairs Manh Truong, Minh Khang, Do Minh.
- Vietnamese Band (Ban nhạc Việt) – VTV3: He led this program throughout its 2 seasons.
- True Love (Chân ái) – VTV3: Xuan Bac is a co-host with Cat Tuong. However, he only hosts alone in season 2 of the program "True Love 4.0".
- Miss Vietnam 2016 – VTV9: Commentator
- Student's Greeting (Lời chào SV) – VTV3: He participated in the program as a judge accompanying journalist Lai Van Sam in the 2016 and 2020 SV seasons.
- Swap (Hoán đổi) – VTV3: He was replaced by Truong Giang in episode 9 of the program.
- Who Wants to Be a Millionaire (Ai là Triệu Phú) – VTV3: He first appeared on the show Who Wants to Be a Millionaire on the December 30, 2014 episode as a guest with comedian Tu Long – the main player at that time. On the March 30, 2021 episode, he continued to participate as a guest with his companion Bi Beo – his son.
- Commentary on World Cup 2014, Euro 2012 and Euro 2020 – VTV: Guest commentary.
- Morning Coffee (Cà phê sáng) – VTV3: Guest chat.
- Familiar Faces Kids (Gương mặt thân quen nhí) – VTV3: Main judge in season 4.
- Piggy Bank (Heo đất) – VTV7: Host.
- Weekend Appointment (Cuộc hẹn cuối tuần) – VTV3: Guest.
- Dream Square (Quảng trường những giấc mơ) (VTV3's 25th Birthday): He and his son Bi came to the show as guests.
- King of Vietnamese (Vua tiếng Việt) – VTV3: Host (in the first four seasons).
- Super Challenge (Siêu thử thách) – HTV2: Main judge.
- 12 Zodiacs (12 con giáp) – VTV3: "Old Man" character.
- Beautiful Life (Cuộc sống tươi đẹp) – VTV3: Family Moments judge.
- Hour 9+ (Giờ thứ 9+) – VTV3: Guest.
- Private Plane No. 6 (Chuyên cơ số 6) – VTV6: Guest.
- Listen to Music with Me (Nghe nhạc cùng tôi) – VTV3: Guest.
- Happy Lunch (Bữa trưa vui vẻ) – VTV6: Guest.
- Miss Vietnam 2022 – VTV2: Deputy Head of the Jury.
- What to Eat This Tet (Tết nay ăn gì) – HTV7: Guest.

== See also ==
- Tự Long
- Kim Oanh
