= Bắc Hà district =

Coordinates: 22.500°N 104.250°E

Bắc Hà district Huyện Bắc Hà
- District
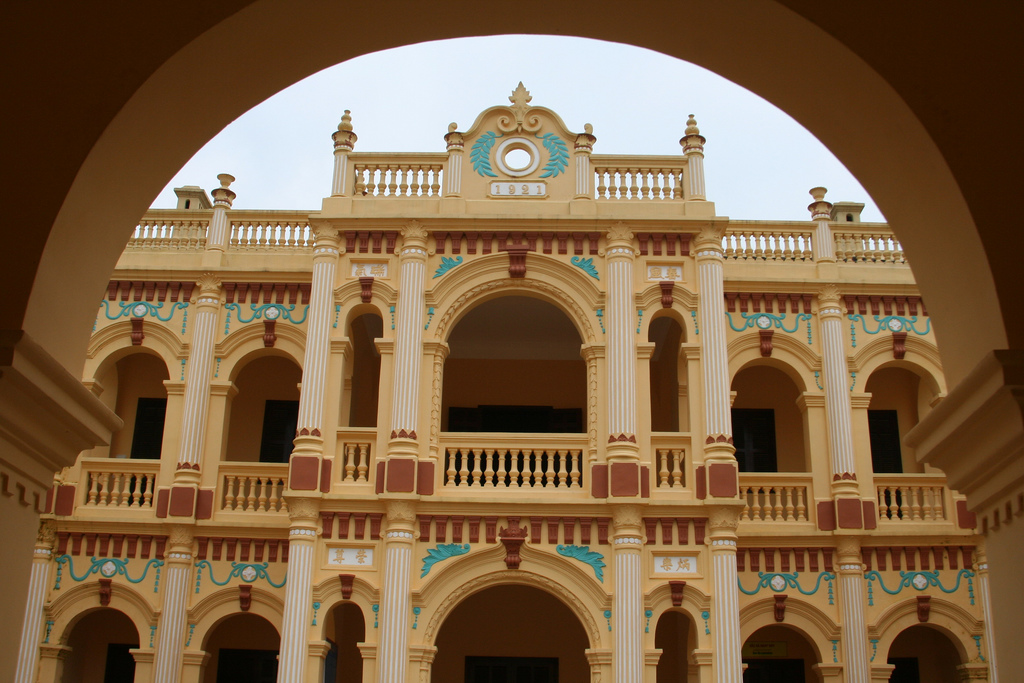
- Palace in Bắc Hà District

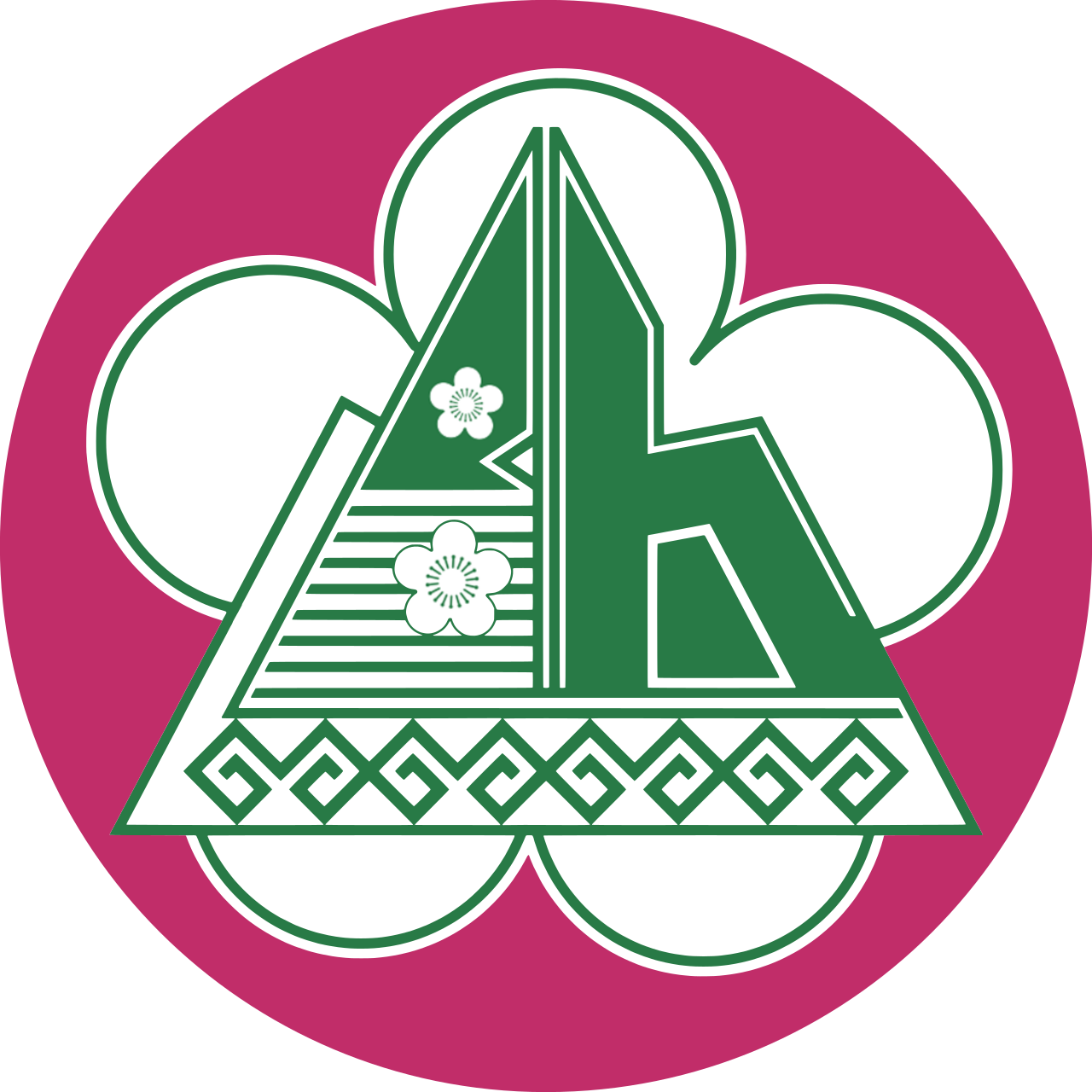
- Seal
- Interactive map of Bắc Hà district
- Country: Vietnam
- Region: Northwest
- Province: Lào Cai
- Capital: Bắc Hà

Area
  - Total: 260 sq mi (680 km^{2})

Population (2003)
  - Total: 48,988
- Time zone: UTC+7 (Indochina Time)

Bắc Hà is a former rural district of Lào Cai province in the Northwest region of Vietnam.

== History ==
Bắc Hà is the capital of the region of the Flower Hmong, one of the 54 minorities of Vietnam and one of the six groups of Hmong people, from 1954 to present. The name Bắc Hà originates from the Tày language Pạc kha, which means "one hundred bundles of kunai grass". Several other place names in Bắc Hà are of Quan hỏa (Southwestern Mandarin) origin.

This district is famous for its Sunday morning market, where thousands of locals gather, with the women dressed in their very intricate handmade costumes (it takes three to five months to embroider one by hand), as well as the Saturday morning smaller market of Cán Cấu ("the river port"), 18 kilometres (11 mi) north of Bắc Hà. The town is enjoying an economic boom thanks to tourism, centered on the markets and, more and more, excellent trekking in the mountains north of the town.

Bắc Hà was the location at which the adventure sport competition "Raid Gauloises" was held in 2002. Bắc Hà is also famous for its Tam Hoa plums; the flowers of the tree must bloom three times before the fruits are ripe. As of 2003, the district had a population of 48,988. The district covers an area of 2,680 square kilometres (1,030 sq mi). The district capital lies at Bắc Hà.

== Administrative divisions ==
Bắc Hà (district capital), Bản Phố, Bản Liền, Bản Già, Bảo Nhai, Bản Cái, Cốc Ly, Cốc Lầu, Nậm Mòn, Nậm Khánh, Nậm Đét, Na Hối, Lầu Thí Ngài, Lùng Phìn, Lùng Cải, Tả Củ Tỷ, Tả Van Chư, Tà Chải, Thải Giàng Phố, Hoàng Thu Phố and Nậm Lúc.

== Climate ==
Climate data for Bắc Hà, elevation 957 m (3,140 ft)
Month	Jan	Feb	Mar	Apr	May	Jun	Jul	Aug	Sep	Oct	Nov	Dec	Year
Mean daily maximum °C (°F)	15.3 (59.5)	17.1 (62.8)	20.7 (69.3)	24.5 (76.1)	27.0 (80.6)	28.0 (82.4)	27.9 (82.2)	27.8 (82.0)	26.5 (79.7)	23.8 (74.8)	20.6 (69.1)	17.0 (62.6)	23.0 (73.4)
Daily mean °C (°F)	11.3 (52.3)	12.8 (55.0)	16.1 (61.0)	19.9 (67.8)	22.5 (72.5)	23.9 (75.0)	23.9 (75.0)	23.4 (74.1)	22.0 (71.6)	19.5 (67.1)	15.9 (60.6)	12.4 (54.3)	18.6 (65.5)
Mean daily minimum °C (°F)	8.8 (47.8)	10.2 (50.4)	13.2 (55.8)	16.7 (62.1)	19.5 (67.1)	21.0 (69.8)	21.2 (70.2)	20.6 (69.1)	19.1 (66.4)	16.9 (62.4)	13.0 (55.4)	9.4 (48.9)	15.8 (60.4)
Average precipitation mm (inches)	26.5 (1.04)	29.7 (1.17)	57.5 (2.26)	122.2 (4.81)	186.9 (7.36)	235.1 (9.26)	279.8 (11.02)	343.7 (13.53)	213.0 (8.39)	117.4 (4.62)	62.3 (2.45)	24.8 (0.98)	1,702.8 (67.04)
Average rainy days	10.7	10.1	10.4	13.2	15.0	17.4	21.1	22.2	17.1	13.2	9.6	7.8	168.5
Average relative humidity (%)	88.6	88.1	86.5	85.1	84.1	85.6	86.7	87.4	87.1	87.2	87.2	87.2	86.7
Mean monthly sunshine hours	80.4	87.1	115.3	147.2	165.5	137.1	135.9	136.7	121.4	103.1	108.9	98.4	1,436.6
Source: Vietnam Institute for Building Science and Technology
