= Chi Pu =

Vietnamese actress and singer (born 1956)

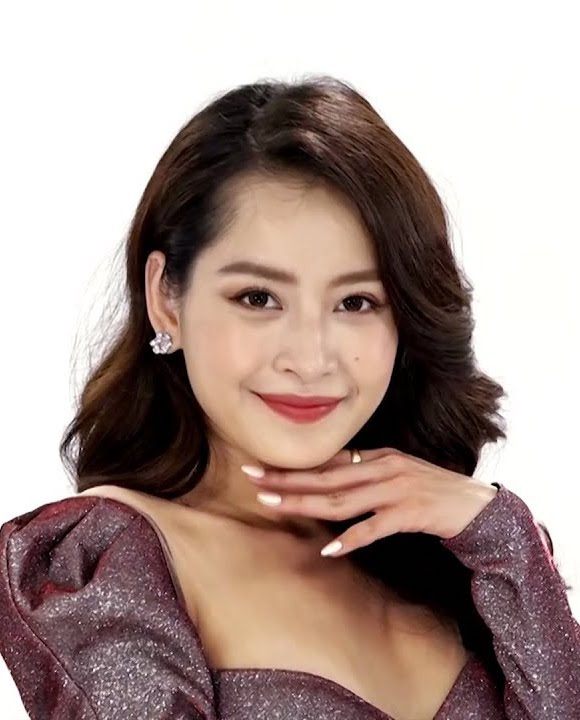
- Chi Pu in 2019
- Born: Nguyễn Thùy Chi; June 14, 1993 (age 32); Hanoi, Vietnam
- Occupations: Actress; model; presenter
- Years active: 2009–present
- Agent: GOM Entertainment (since 2017)
- Height: 1.63 m (5 ft 4 in)
- Awards: Forbes Asia's Top 100 Digital Stars 2020 (Asia & Pacific); Actress of the Year - Elle Style Awards 2017; Asia Rising Star - Asia Artist Awards 2016

YouTube information
- Channel: Chi Pu Official
- Years active: 2013–present
- Genre: Music
- Subscribers: 1.46 million
- Views: 500.6 million
- Last updated: January 20, 2026

Nguyễn Thùy Chi (born June 14, 1993), commonly known by her stage name Chi Pu, is a Vietnamese actress and singer. She gained popularity with her lead roles in several television dramas and sitcoms including Waterdrop, Happy Dream, and 5S Online. Chi Pu officially started her singing career in 2017. In 2020, Chi Pu was honored among Forbes list of Asia Pacific's 100 most influential digital stars.

== Life and career ==
Chi Pu was born on June 14, 1993 in Hanoi, Vietnam. Her father is a member of the Vietnamese military, and her mother is an English teacher. She has an older sister who works in the banking industry. Chi Pu rose to fame after placing Top 20 Miss Teen Vietnam 2009. Afterwards, she joined the entertainment industry and became a teen idol. According to Socialbaker, as of November 2016, Chi Pu had the most followers of any Vietnamese actress on Facebook, Instagram, and YouTube.

In 2013, Chi Pu started her acting career with leading roles in the television dramas Waterdrop and Happy Dream, which were broadcast on Vietnam National Television. That same year, she joined 5S Online, a popular Vietnamese television series]. She produced and acted in her first short film, Under One Sky. The short film was highly rated among audiences and critics, receiving a Golden Kite Award the following year. At the end of 2013, Chi Pu appeared in her first full-length film, Thần tượng (The Talent), which won 6 Golden Kite Awards. Chi Pu also appeared in the horror movies Chung cư ma (Hush) and Hương Ga (Rise), which won Best Vietnamese Film at the 2016 San Francisco International New Concept Film Festival.

In 2014, Chi Pu has been the leading role in the television drama Vẫn có em bên đời (You’re Always by my Side). The drama received high ratings, earning Chi Pu an HTV Award for Most Favorite Television Drama Actress. Chi Pu produced and acted in her second short movie called My Sunshine that same year. The movie received positive reviews for its message supporting the LGBT community. In 2015, Chi Pu had a leading role in Yêu (Love). The LGBT movie grossed more than half million USD within three days of its release. It also won the Golden Apricot Blossom Awards for Best Movie in 2015. Yêu won Chi Pu nominations for Best Actress at the 2015 Golden Apricot Blossom Awards and Green Star Awards. In 2015, Chi Pu was the backstage host for Dancing with the Stars Kids Vietnam - Season 2. In 2016, Chi Pu was one of the two hosts for The Voice Kids Vietnam - Season 4. Chi Pu was the judge for several beauty and style competitions, such as Miss Panasonic Beauty 2015 and Shine Your Style Contest with L'Officiel Vietnam's editorial secretary Angie Nguyễn and Lý Quí Khánh.

Chi Pu voiced the character Glim in the French animated movie Mune: Guardian of the Moon. Chi Pu took part in the musical Thiên đài (The Rooftop), an adaptation of the famous same-name musical movie by the Chinese artist Jay Chou.

In 2016, Chi Pu produced her first web series Wake Up. The 7-episode series was broadcast on V Live and YouTube. Chi Pu produced, co-wrote, starred, and sang the OST. The budget for the series was about $150,000, paid for by Chi Pu and brand sponsorships. In July 2016, Chi Pu performed her song "Fighting Fighting" (Wake up OST) at Viral Fest Asia 2016 - a musical event held in Bali, Indonesia. In October 2016, Chi Pu was invited by Korean Daily News Hankook Ilbo and V LIVE (Naver) for a tourism and beauty experience in Seoul. In November 2016, Chi Pu attended the first Asia Artist Awards in Seoul, Korea.

She released several songs including "Fighting Fighting" (Wake up OST), "Stay with me" (LOVE OST), Ngày bồng bềnh, "Tada X’mas" (feat. Gil Lê). She earned third place in Dancing with the Stars Vietnam Season 6.

Chi Pu started her singing career in 2017 and immediately garnered attention from media outlets and fans.

She is one of 33 contestants competing in the fourth season of Chinese reality show “Sisters Who Make Waves” which broadcast in 2023. She had the sixth highest score at the end of the final episode on July 22. She also won two sub-categories in the show, including the "Fan Favorite" award for her "Shut Up and Dance" song, which she performed with Ella and former contestant Meng Jia in a previous season of the show, and the "Overcoming Challenges" award. Her performance earned Chi Pu a position as part of the 11-member girl group that will debut and be active in the Chinese entertainment industry after the show.

== Public image and activism ==
In 2015, Chi Pu was honored as Upcoming Female Actress at ELLE Style Awards by ELLE Vietnam. Chi Pu was the first Vietnamese actress who partnered with a fashion brand to launch her own collection. Chi Pu partnered with TheBlueTshirt and PUSW to launch two fashion collections. She used to work for Innisfree, Pepsi, Heineken, Panasonic Beauty, Nestea, and Cornetto. She is currently brand ambassador for Yamaha Janus, Dove Vietnam, OPPO Cameraphone. In April 2016, Chi Pu was the first Vietnamese artist to cooperate with Google in their Google App advertising campaign in Vietnam.

Chi Pu is often active in nonprofit and volunteer organizations. Recently, she urged people to contribute funds to support flood victims in Central Vietnam. Chi Pu also advocated funding heart surgeries for poor children. She held the event “Trung thu yêu thương” (Beloved Mid-Autumn) to perform and send out gifts for children at the Center for Disabled Children in Ho Chi Minh City.

In 2015, Chi Pu was one of the ambassadors for “Về đi Vàng ơi” (Come home Golden), a campaign launched by Asia Canine Protection Alliance (ACPA). The campaign advocated for an end to the theft, trade, and cruel actions of dogs. Along with other artists, Chi Pu encouraged people to stop hunting and consuming rhino horns in Vietnam.

== Discography ==
=== Extended plays ===
Title	Album details
Love Story	Released: October 28, 2017 (Korea); Label: Krazy Sound; Formats: Digital download

== Filmography ==
=== Film ===
Year	Title	Role
2013	Thần tượng	Minh Tú
2014	Hương Ga	Diệu
2014	Chung cư ma	Ngọc
2015	Yêu	Nhi
2016	Vệ sĩ Sài Gòn	Thi
2018	Live Again, Love Again	Mi
2019	Chị chị em em	Bảo Nhi
2022	Mười: Lời nguyền trở lại	Linh
2023	Người Mặt Trời	Triệu

== Discography ==
=== 2013 ===
- "Tiểu thư cá tính" (composed by Dương Khắc Linh)

=== 2014 ===
- "Tada Xmas" (with Gil Lê) (composed by Kai Đinh)

=== 2015 ===
- "Stay With Me" (composed by Kai Đinh)

=== 2016 ===
- "Ngày Bồng Bềnh" (composed by Lê Cát Trọng Lý)

=== 2017 ===
- "Đón Xuân Tuyệt Vời" (with Hoàng Thùy Linh): released on January 17, composed by TRIPLE D
- "Từ hôm nay (Feel Like Ooh)": released on October 10, composed by Park, Eddy S Park
- "Cho ta gần hơn (I'm in love)": released on October 27, composed by Krazy Park, Eddy S Park
- "Em sai rồi anh xin lỗi em đi (#ESRAXLED)": released on November 26, composed by Trang Phap
- "Talk to me (Có nên dừng lại)": released on December 21, composed by Triple D

=== 2018 ===
- "Đóa hoa hồng (Queen) (Dance Version)": released on May 15, composed by Andiez - NNeo
- "Đóa Hoa hồng (Queen) (Story Version)": released on May 21
- "Mời Anh Vào Team Em": released on November 27, composed by Dat G

=== 2019 ===
- "Anh Ơi Ở Lại": released on April 23, written by Đat G
- "Em nói anh rồi": released on August 2, composed by Park Jeongwook (M.O.T)
- "Shh! Chỉ ta biết thôi": released on December 26, written and produced by Nguyen Phuc Thien

=== 2020 ===
- "Cung đàn vỡ đôi": released on June 3, written by Kiên
- "Mơ Anh": released on September 3, written by Mew Amazing

=== 2021 ===
- "Đừng Đùa Với Lửa" (released on November 17)

=== 2022 ===
- "Black Hickey (Con Dấu Chủ Quyền)" (released on August 8)
- "Sashimi" (released on September 9)
- "Miss Showbiz" (release on October 13)

=== 2023 ===
- "Hoa Dưới Mặt Trời" (released on November 30)

=== 2024 ===
- "Follow Me" (released on January 24)

== Awards and nominations ==
- Face of the Year 2022 – Most Favorite Female Actress
- Forbes Asia's Top 100 Digital Star 2020 (Asia & Pacific)
- TikTok Awards 2020 – Public Figure of The Year
- Face of the Year 2022 – Most Favorite Female Actress
- Elle Style Awards 2017 – Actress of the Year
- 1st Asia Artist Awards 2016 – Rookie Award
- WebTV Asia Awards 2016 – Most Popular Online Drama
- Golden Apricot Blossom Awards – Artist of the Year 2015
- HTV Awards – The Most Favorite Television Drama Actress 2015
- Elle Style Awards 2015 – Upcoming Female Actress of the Year 2015
- Star Awards – Beauty Queen of the Year 2015
- Golden Kite Awards 2014 – Best Short Film (Under One Sky)
- Bronze Prize – Dancing with the Stars Vietnam 2015
- We Choice Awards – Top 10 Most Influential People of the Year 2014
- The Box Idol 2013
- Top 20 Miss Teen Vietnam 2009
