= Kitchen God =

Chinese domestic god

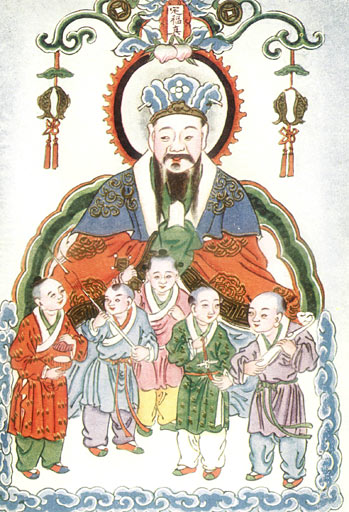
- Zao Jun

Chinese name
- Chinese: 灶君
- Literal meaning: stove master
Transcriptions
Standard Mandarin
- Hanyu Pinyin: Zào Jūn
Yue: Cantonese
- Yale Romanization: Jou Gwān
- Jyutping: Zou3 Gwan1
Southern Min
- Hokkien POJ: Chàu-kun
Middle Chinese
- Middle Chinese: tsawH kjun

Alternative Chinese name
- Chinese: 灶神
- Literal meaning: stove deity, stove spirit
Transcriptions
Standard Mandarin
- Hanyu Pinyin: Zào Shén
Yue: Cantonese
- Yale Romanization: Jou Sàhn
- Jyutping: Zou3 San4
Southern Min
- Hokkien POJ: Chàu-sîn
Middle Chinese
- Middle Chinese: tsawH zyin

Second alternative Chinese name
- Chinese: 灶君公
- Literal meaning: stove master lord
Transcriptions
Southern Min
- Hokkien POJ: Chàu-kun-kong

Vietnamese name
- Vietnamese alphabet: Táo Quân
- Chữ Hán: 灶君

The kitchen deity – also known as the Stove God, named Zao Jun, Zao Shen, Zao kimjah, Cokimjah or Zhang Lang – is the most important of a plethora of Chinese domestic gods that protect the hearth and family. The Kitchen God is recognized in Chinese folk religion, Chinese mythology, and Taoism. He is also celebrated throughout the Sinosphere.

It is believed that on the twenty-third day of the twelfth lunisolar month, just before Chinese New Year, the Kitchen deity returns to Heaven to report the activities of every household over the past year to Yu Huang Da Di (Chinese: 玉皇大帝; pinyin: Yùhuángdàdì), the Jade Emperor. The Jade Emperor, emperor of the heavens, either rewards or punishes a family based on Zao Jun's yearly report.

== Story ==
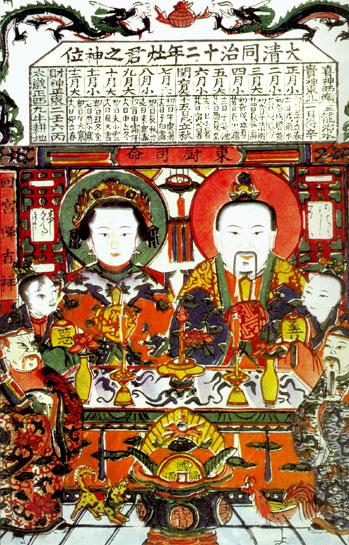
Chinese Kitchen God

=== Zhang Lang ===
Though there are many stories on how Zao Jun became the Kitchen God, the most popular one dates back to around the 2nd century BC. Zao Jun was originally a mortal man living on earth whose name was Zhang Lang. He eventually became married to a virtuous woman but ended up falling in love with a younger woman. He left his wife to be with this younger woman and, as punishment for this adulterous act, the heavens afflicted him with ill fortune. He became blind, and his young lover abandoned him, leaving him to resort to begging to support himself.

Once, while begging for alms, he happened to cross the house of his former wife. Being blind, he did not recognize her. Despite his shoddy treatment of her, she took pity on him and invited him in. She cooked him a fabulous meal and tended to him lovingly; he then related his story to her. As he shared his story, Zhang Lang became overwhelmed with self-pity and the pain of his error and began to weep. Upon hearing him apologize, Zhang's former wife told him to open his eyes and his vision was restored. Recognizing the wife he had abandoned, Zhang felt such shame that he threw himself into the kitchen hearth, not realizing that it was lit. His former wife attempted to save him, but all she managed to salvage was one of his legs.

The devoted woman then created a shrine to her former husband above the fireplace, which began Zao Jun's association with the stove in Chinese homes. To this day, a fire poker is sometimes referred to as "Zhang Lang's Leg".

=== Zao Jun ===
Alternatively, there is another tale where Zao Jun was a man so poor he was forced to sell his wife. Years later he unwittingly became a servant in the house of her new husband. Taking pity on him she baked him some cakes into which she had hidden money, but he failed to notice this and sold the cakes for a pittance. When he realized what he had done he took his own life in despair. In both stories, Heaven takes pity on Zhang Lang's tragic story. Instead of becoming a vampirish hopping corpse, the usual fate of suicides, he was made the god of the Kitchen and was reunited with his wife.

=== Other stories ===
Another origin story of the Stove God is believed to have appeared soon after the invention of the brick stove. The Kitchen God was originally believed to have resided in the stove and only later took on human form. During the Han dynasty, it is believed that a poor farmer named Yin Zifang, was surprised by the Kitchen God who appeared on Chinese New Year as he was cooking his breakfast. Yin Zifang decided to sacrifice his only yellow sheep. In doing so, he became rich and decided that every winter he would sacrifice one yellow sheep in order to display his deep gratitude.

== Worship and customs ==
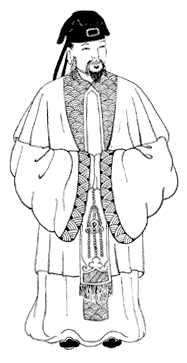
Kitchen God Zao Jun

The Stove God is generally not a god of "the culinary arts", and his role revolves more around morality and conduct of the family. The Stove God, often depicted with his wife, monitor the conduct of the family and report it annually to the Jade Emperor.

Traditionally, every Chinese household would have a paper effigy or a plaque of Zao Jun and his wife (who writes down everything that is said in the household over the year for her husband's report to Jade Emperor) above the fireplace in the kitchen. This tradition is still widely practiced, and Zao Jun was the most highly worshiped god of those who protect the household and family. Offerings of food and incense are made to Zao Jun on his birthday (the third day of the eighth lunisolar month) and also on the twenty third day (or twenty fourth day) of the twelfth lunisolar month, which marks his return to Heaven to give his New Year's report to the Jade Emperor. On this day, the lips of Zao Jun's paper effigy are often smeared with honey to sweeten his words to the Jade Emperor, or to keep his lips stuck together. After this, the effigy will be burnt and replaced by a new one on New Year's Day. Firecrackers are often lit as well, to speed him on his way to heaven. If the household has a statue or a nameplate of Zao Jun it will be taken down and cleaned on this day for the new year.

Many customs are associated with the Kitchen God, especially defining the date of the "Kitchen God festival", also known as "Little New Year". It is noted that the date differed depending on the location. It is believed that people in northern China celebrate it on the twenty-third day of the twelfth lunisolar month, while the people in southern China celebrate it on the twenty-fourth. Along with location, traditionally the date may also be determined by one's Profession. For example, "feudal officials made their offerings to the Kitchen God on the twenty-third, the common people on the twenty-fourth, and coastal fishing people on the twenty-fifth". In addition, generally it was the males of the household that lead the sacrificial rites.

In order to establish a fresh beginning in the New Year, families must be organized both within their family unit, in their home, and around their yard. This custom of a thorough house cleaning and yard cleaning is another popular custom during "Little New Year". It is believed that in order for ghosts and deities to depart to Heaven, both their homes and "persons" must be cleansed. Lastly, the old decorations are taken down, and there are new posters and decorations put up for the following Spring Festival.

In the 1970s in northern Taiwan, families generally had a "large brick cooking stove" where they cooked most meals was seen as the "corporate" embodiment of the family and its individuality. The "soul of the family" that was identical to its fate as a singular, "corporate" body or entity was thought to be located in the stove. When family members move away, younger brothers transfer "hot coals from the old stove to their new ones, thereby inviting the Stove God to join them."

== Family ==
Independent Chinese families are classified accordingly to the stove they possess. Because circumstances of a divided household, kitchens are shared but never the stove. In the case of a father's death, the sons divide their father's household. The eldest son inherits the stove and the younger brothers transfer the coals from the old stove to their own new stoves. This invites the Stove god to join their newly formed households. This process is called "pun chu" or dividing the stove. This indicates the "soul" of the family and it signifies fate of the family.

An event involving a stove that became a Chinese story which said, "'When a shaman informed one family that there were ants and other things in their stove, they destroyed the stove and threw the bricks and coals into the river.' A neighbor explained, 'There was nothing else they could do. A family will never have peace if they don't have a good stove.'"

Ahern, Martin & Wolf 1978 state that, "The association of Stove God and God is thus an association of God and family. The Character of the relationship is essentially bureaucratic; the family is the smallest corporate unit in society, and the Stove God is the lowest ranking member of a supernatural bureaucracy." This relates a correlation of the Stove god and the importance of this deity is to the family unit.

The domestic deity is seen as being in charge of watching over the home life. It has been expressed that his presence is more like that of a policeman sent from above to observe the family. This practice is known as a bureaucratization of religion in Chinese society. The Jade Emperor is in charge of an administration divided into bureaus, and each bureaucrat-god takes responsibility for a clearly defined domain or discrete function. The Kitchen God would thus serve the role of the home domain as he would overlook the daily dynamics of a family, the members and their behavior.

Ting 2002 also states that there are three levels of cosmology containing an organization of heaven is like that of the organization on earth. With a supreme deity – an Emperor (Jade Emperor or Heavenly God) – Local Officials (City gods) – Commoners (gods of the hearth). This confirms the organization of the heavens and how the Kitchen God reports to higher level God, the Jade Emperor.

According to Mann 1997, there is another god that shares the realm of the household:

Pollution, sickness, and death were everyday concerns for women in the household as well as the focal points of their spiritual and ritual lives. Within their households they worshiped the deities who oversaw these homely concerns. The goddess of the household were territorial deities who shared the domain with the Kitchen God, worshiped by men. This God is known as the Purple Goddess or Privy Goddess.

The Privy goddess was worshiped only by women and no temples have been erected in her honor and has no relation or interaction with the Kitchen God.

== In literature ==
The Chinese story (Chinese: 俞淨意公遇灶神記; pinyin: Yújìngyì gōng yù zàoshén jì) Visit of the Spirit of the kitchen to Iô-kung or Visit of the Spirit of the kitchen to Yu-gong is about the Kitchen God who visits a scholar who does good deeds only for selfish intentions, and convinces him to reform himself to avoid punishment. The story was translated into Manchu as ᡳᡡ
ᡤᡠᠩ
ᠵᡠᠨ
ᡳ
ᡝᠨᡩᡠᡵᡳ
ᠪᡝ
ᡠᠴᠠᡵᠠᡥᠠ
ᡤᡳ
ᠪᡳᡨᡥᡝ Wylie: Iô gung chun i enduri pe utcharaha gi pitghe, Möllendorff: Iū gung jun i enduri be ucaraha gi bithe.

Laurence Yep's novel Dragonwings describes the honey ritual, but the book refers to the deity as the Stove King.

Zao Jun's story is interwoven with a feminist spin into the protagonist's story in Amy Tan's novel The Kitchen God's Wife. She reflects on her life story as a Chinese American woman. She uses the symbolism of the Kitchen God's story and uses it as a parallel towards modern day life. She outlines the patriarchy that still exists within modern day life but more significantly in Chinese cultural practices. Tan also illustrates several facets of the humble status of women in Chinese society in the early 20th century.

In Tan's story, there is an elaborate description of the coming of Zao Jun. The character Winnie goes into detail about how he came to be and attempts to address cultural struggles as she removes the picture of the Kitchen God from her daughter Pearl's stove, as she does not believe this is the kind of luck Pearl needs. She then promises to fill the altar with the image of another god. In addition to this cultural struggle there is also a feminist undertone in the ritual, which can be viewed as a struggle between traditionalism and biculturalism.

== See also ==
- Agni, Hindu stove and fire god
- Enzhugong (恩主公)
- Festival of the Kitchen God
- Hestia/Vesta - Ancient Greco-Roman goddess of the hearth
  - Deipneus Ancient Greek god of bread baking
- Household deity
- Jowangsin, Korean kitchen god
- Kitchen god
- Sanbō-Kōjin, Japanese kitchen god
- Ông Táo, Vietnamese kitchen god
- Ukemochi, Shinto goddess of food

== Bibliography ==
- The Story of the Kitchen God
- "Chinese festivals - Xiao Nian". 2007. Chinavoc. 19 October 2008 Chinese Festivals - Xiao Nian (Kitchen God reports to the Jade Emperor)
- "Chinese Kitchen God". 2008. Qiqi.com: Chinese Cultures. November 14, 2008. QiQi.com | The home for Chinese Culture!
- Gong, Rosemary. "The Kitchen God". 2008. About.com: Chinese Culture. 19 October 2008 Kitchen Gods
- "Kitchen God Day". 2008. Childbook.com: Chinese Festivals. October 24, 2008. Kitchen God Day
- "The Kitchen God and His Wife". 2007. Columbia University: Living in the Chinese Cosmos: Understanding Religion in Late Imperial China 1644–1911. November 15, 2008. Living in the Chinese Cosmos | Asia for Educators
- "Little New Year: Busy Preparations". Spring 2007. CHINA.ORG.CN. 25 October 2008. Little New Year: Busy Preparations -- china.org.cn
- Mikkolainen, Terhi (23 May 2007). "Zao Jun: The Kitchen God". radio86. Archived from the original on 1 December 2008.
- Tan, Amy (1991). The Kitchen God's Wife. New York: G.P. Putnam's Sons. pp. 53–56. ISBN 9780399135781.
- Ting, Julia (2002). Oxtoby, Willard G. (ed.). World Religions: Eastern Traditions. East Asian Religions. New York: Oxford University Press. p. 326.
- Knapp, Ronald G. (1999). China's Living Houses: Folk beliefs, symbols and household Ornamentation. University of Hawaii Press.
- Ahern, Emily M.; Martin, Emily; Wolf, Arthur P. (1978). Studies in Chinese Society. University Press.
- Mann, Susan (1997). Precious Records: Women in China's Long Eighteenth Century. Stanford University Press.
- Rawski, Evelyn S. (2001). The Last Emperors: A Social History of Qing Imperial Institutions. University of California Press.
- Tan, Chee Beng (1983). Chinese Religion in Malaysia: A General View. Asian Folklore Studies. Vol. 42. University of Malaysia. pp. 220–252.
