= Kōjin =

Japanese god of fire, the hearth, and the kitchen

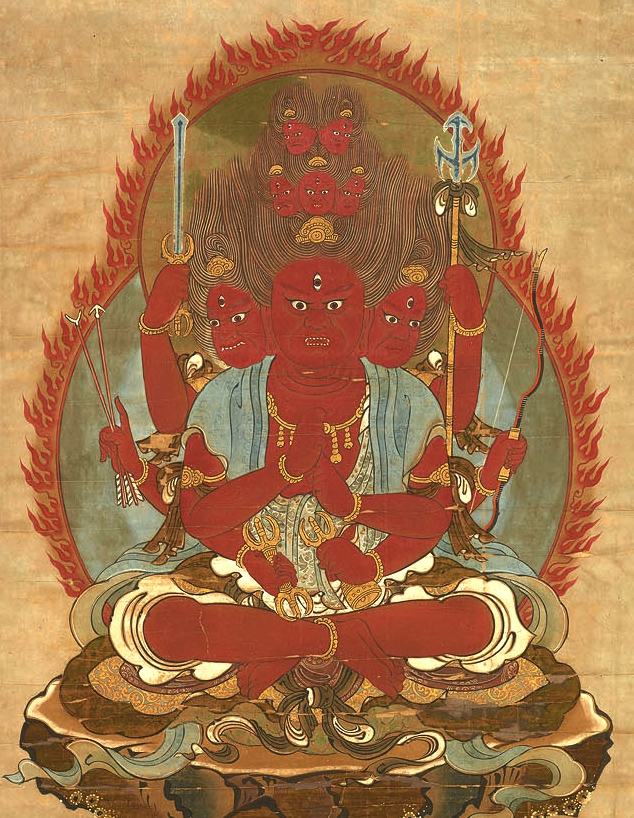
Sanbō Kōjin ("fierce god (kōjin) of the Three Jewels"), the Japanese Buddhist god of the hearth

Kōjin, also known as Sambō-Kōjin or Sanbō-Kōjin (三宝荒神), is the kami (god) of fire, the hearth and the kitchen. He is sometimes called Kamado-gami (竃神), literally the god of the stove. He represents violent forces that are turned toward the betterment of humankind.

== Mythology ==
The name Sambō-Kōjin means three-way rough deity, and he is considered a deity of uncertain temper. Fire, which he represents, is a destructive force, as shown in the myth of Kagu-tsuchi, the original fire deity, whose birth caused his mother's death. However, Kōjin embodies fire controlled and turned toward a good purpose. He is said to destroy all impurity. He is also responsible for watching over the household and reporting any misdeeds to the kami of the village or city. These reports are discussed, and the according rewards or punishments assigned, by an assembly of gods in Izumo province in the tenth month of the traditional lunar calendar.

Kōjin is sometimes identified as an incarnation of Fudō Myō-Ō, who is likewise depicted as surrounded by flames and tasked with dealing with misdeeds.

As Kamado-gami, he is sometimes depicted as female.

== Worship ==
Traditionally, a representation of Kōjin is placed near the hearth. This representation might be a simple fuda (memorial tablet) in many homes, or it might be as elaborate as a statue, as is common in Buddhist temples. In his statues, Kōjin is depicted with flaming hair, fangs, and a contorted face, and he often wields a bow and arrows. He has two pairs of hands. Some representations of Kōjin present him as possessing three heads.

The Kōjiki mentions an imperial script detailing instructions for worshipping Kōjin, in the form of Kamado-gami.

Kōjin is believed to have come from Shugendō worshippers from the late Heian or early Kamakura period.

== See also ==
- Agni
- Hestia, Greek goddess of the hearth
- Jowangshin, Korean kitchen god
- Kagu-tsuchi, kami of fire
- Kamuy-huci, an Ainu kitchen god
- Kitchen god
- Lares
- Ông Táo, Vietnamese kitchen god
- Vesta (mythology), Roman goddess of the hearth
- Zàojūn, Chinese kitchen god
