= Gala Laugh =

Vietnamese satirical comedy program

- Creative director: Thảo Vân
- Presented by: Thảo Vân
- Starring: Thảo Vân
- Country of origin: Vietnam

Production
- Producer: VFC

Original release
- Network: Vietnam Television
- Release: 31 January 2003 – present

Gala cười (lit. The Laugh Gala) is the name of a satirical comedy program produced by Vietnam Television Film Center. First aired from 2003 to 2005, as a replacements of comedy show Gặp nhau cuối tuần (Weekend Gathering) in the last months of the year, the show later aired quarterly a year in 2007. Since 2010, the show aired yearly, mainly broadcast in the 2nd day of Tết Nguyên Đán. Originally, the audience can vote favorite comedy team by telephone.

== Constitute ==
The program was first broadcast on the morning of August 30, 2003, Gala is laughing comedy show where the team will live comedy sketch comedy on stage.

== Development ==
=== Broadcast schedule ===
The program is broadcast regularly on Saturdays at 10:00 am each week, replay on Wednesday at 21:00 the next day as a replacement of Gặp nhau cuối tuần in the final months of the year, from 30 August 2003 to 2005. The year-end special, Gặp nhau cuối năm, aired yearly on 30 December. The 30 December 2006 special was dedicated as the final episode of Gặp nhau cuối tuần, after seven years on-air. In 2007, the program is broadcast quarterly a year. From 2010 onwards, the program is broadcast yearly, on the selected days in the Lunar New Year.

== See also ==
- Gặp nhau cuối năm
- Xả xì choet
- Thư giãn cuối tuần
