= Ông Táo =

Vietnamese god of fire and the kitchen

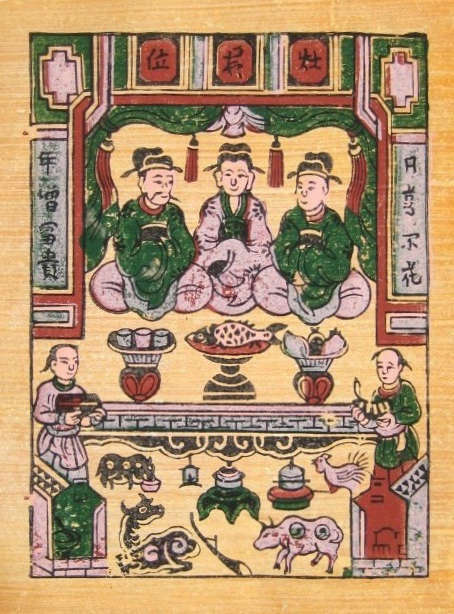
Đông Hồ painting of Ông Táo

Ông Táo (翁灶) also known as Táo Quân (灶君, Mandarin Táo), Táo Vương (灶王), Thần Bếp (神灶), or Vua Bếp (𢂜灶) is the Vietnamese kitchen god regarded in Vietnam's culture as the advocate of a Vietnamese family with the gods and the emissary between heaven to earth.

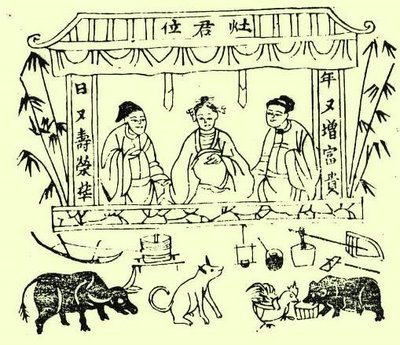
A painting of Ông Táo in the book Mechanics and Crafts of the People of Annam

== Mythology ==
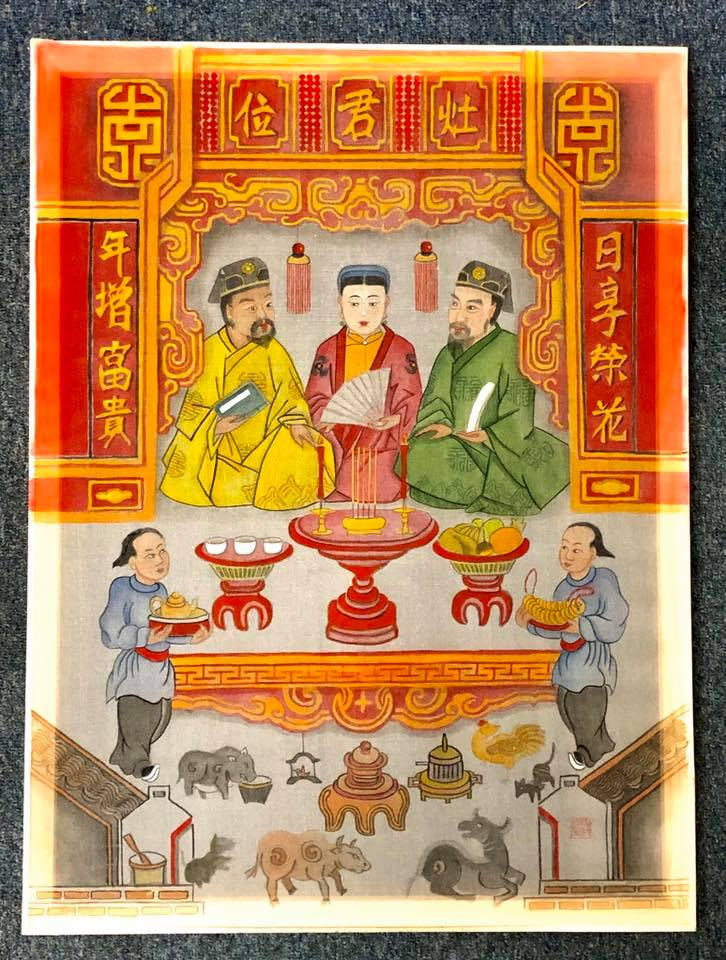
A watercolor painting depicts the three Táo by artist Đoàn Thành Lộc

A long time ago, there was a couple, Trọng Cao and his wife Thị Nhi who were married for many years but had no children. One day, they quarreled over some trivial matter, and the husband, in a fit of anger, beat and threw his wife out of their home. Although Thị Nhi still loved her husband, she had no choice but to go away. Thị Nhi went far away and met a very kind man called Phạm Lang. He married her and he loved Thị Nhi very much. Their life was happy and peaceful but Thị Nhi could not forget her first love. As for Trọng Cao, he had been filled with remorse from the day he sent his wife away. He waited, and waited hopelessly for his wife’s return. Eventually, he decided to set out from his home to search for Thị Nhi. He traveled far and wide, but he could not find his wife. His food ran out and he had to beg for his meals. One day, starving and thirsty, he knocked on the door of a house to ask for food. He was shocked when he recognized his former wife. The sudden appearance of Trọng Cao deeply moved Thị Nhi, and she invited him inside and gave him a good meal. Suddenly, there was a knock on the door. It was Phạm Lang returning. The thought of being discovered with her former husband sent Thị Nhi into a panic. She hid Trọng Cao under a stack of straw. Unfortunately, Phạm Lang set fire to the straw because he needed ashes to fertilize his field. As the flames spread out, Trọng Cao accepted his fate to be burnt to death to protect Thị Nhi’s virtue. Thị Nhi was distraught because her love for Trong Cao had caused his death. Thị Nhi could neither save Trọng Cao from the fire nor tell her husband. She had no choice but to throw herself into the flames. Phạm Lang could not understand why his wife killed herself. Filled with sorrow, he jumped into the burning fire and died with his loving wife. Ngọc Hoàng in the heavens knew the sad story. He was so moved by their devotion and deep love that he decided to help them to live together forever. Using his magic, he changed them into the three hearthstones around the cooking fire, where they became Kitchen Gods. Since that time, the three Táo Quân have been responsible for taking care of all household affairs. Each year, on the 23rd of the last month of the lunar year, the Táo Quân leave the kitchen, they are seen off by the owner of the house, and ride on a carp to the heavens to give a report on each family’s doings. Then they return on the Eve of the first day of the Lunar year.

== Description ==
In Vietnamese culture, the Vietnamese New Year (Tết) is a time to make a new start. Children get red envelopes with money inside, known as "lì xì" (lee-see, 利市) in Vietnamese, as gifts for good luck in the coming year. Vietnamese families prepare their houses for the coming of a prosperous new year by cleaning up and polishing their silver. It is during this cultural event that Ông Táo comes in to serve as the Kitchen God for Vietnamese families. As the old year ends, he goes to heaven to discuss the family's situation with the Ngọc Hoàng, the Heavenly lord.

Tradition has it that the Kitchen God is too poor to buy new clothes, and so he simply wears a long robe and shorts. Other accounts say that because he was in such a hurry to go back to earth, he forgot to put his trousers over his shorts before leaving heaven.

Due to his presence in Vietnamese culture, Ông Táo is a prominent character in many folk plays. Considering his position as a messenger from heaven, the writers often depict the living conditions, problems, and solutions that need to be addressed by a family, to the audience.

Vietnamese people regard Ông Táo as a family member, and various prayers and offerings are brought to him at the family altar.

== The work ==
The three people are collectively known as Táo Quân (full name is Đông Trù Tư Mệnh Táo Phủ Thần Quân (東廚司命灶府神君), but each holds one job:

- Phạm Lang is “Thổ Công” (the God of Kitchen who looks after cooking job)
- Trọng Cao is “Thổ Địa” (the God of Soil who takes care of family affairs)
- Thị Nhi is “Thổ Kỳ” (the God who sees to the matters related to shopping in the market)

== In popular culture ==
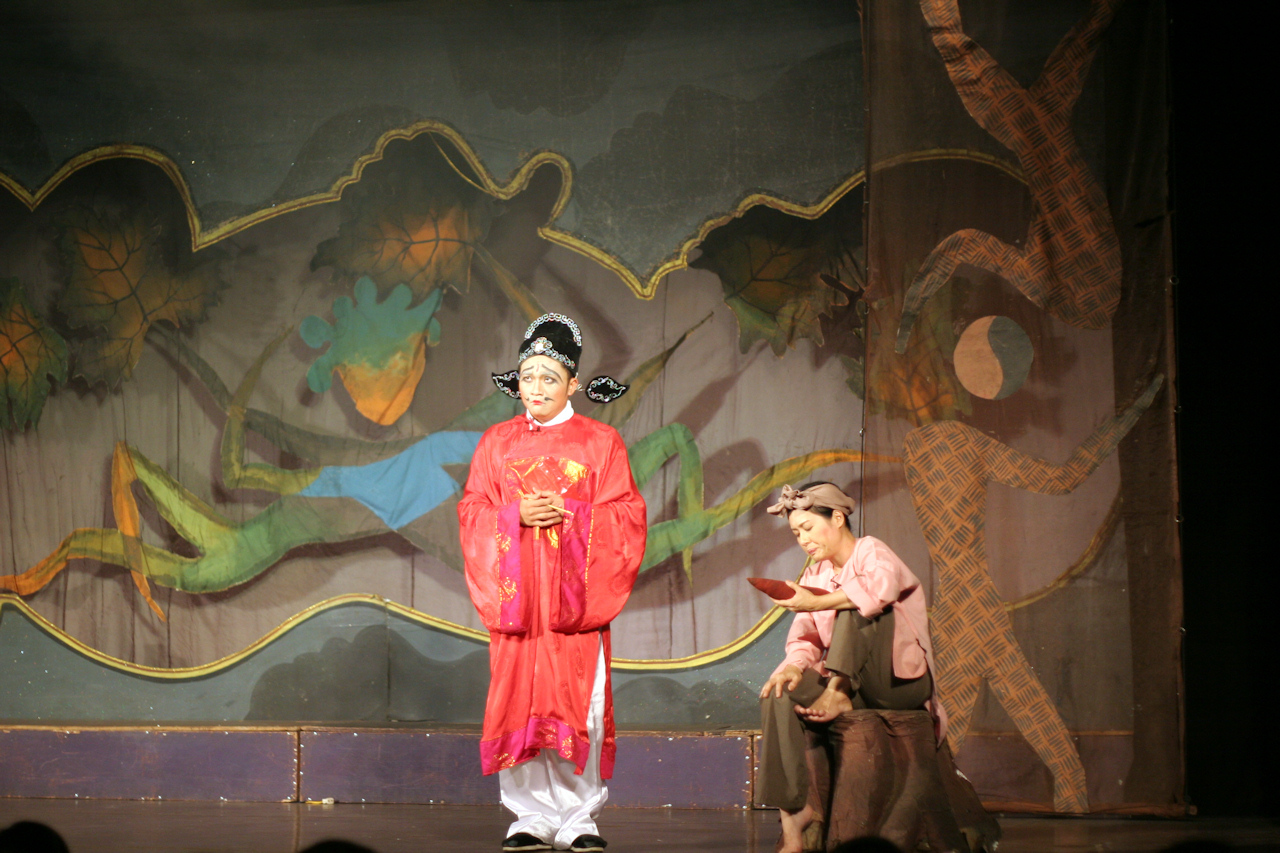
The scene of Táo Quân appearing in the play "12 Bà mụ by Nguyễn Khắc Thưởng

Television program

- Gặp nhau cuối năm

== See also ==
- Jowangsin, Korean kitchen god
- Sanbō-Kōjin, Japanese kitchen god
- Zàojūn, Chinese kitchen god

== Sources ==
- Sequence of the Tet Celebration at ThingsAsian.com, Retrieved March 2010.
