= List of television channels in Vietnam =

This is the list of TV channels that are currently broadcasting and/or formerly broadcast in Vietnam, including defunct channels.

== National broadcasting networks ==
=== Vietnam Television ===
Channel	Content
VTV1	News and current affairs channel
VTV2	Science and education channel
VTV3	Sports and entertainment channel
VTV4	International channel
VTV5	Specialized channel for ethnic minority languages
VTV6	National sports television channel
VTV7	National education television channel
VTV8	Specialized channel for viewers in the Central and Central Highlands region of Vietnam
VTV9	Specialized channel for viewers in the Southeast region of Vietnam
VTV10	Specialized channel for viewers in the Southwest region of Vietnam
Vietnam Today	International channel for English viewers

=== Free-to-air TV channels of other press agencies ===
Channel	Content	Agency
ANTV	Security – Order	People's Public Security Communications Department
QPVN	Military – Defense	Military Radio – Television Center and Viettel Media

== Local stations ==
Vietnam has 34 provinces, each of which has its own station. Here is the list of local stations in Vietnam:

Number	Name of station	Abbreviations	Name of channel(s)	Owner
1	An Giang Newspaper & Radio – Television	ATV	ATV1, ATV2, ATV3	People's Committee of An Giang Province
2	Bac Ninh Newspaper & Radio – Television	BTV		Bac Ninh City People's Committee
3	Ca Mau Newspaper & Radio – Television	CTV		People's Committee of Ca Mau Province
4	Cao Bang Newspaper & Radio – Telelvision	CRTV		People's Committee of Cao Bang Province
5	Can Tho City Newspaper & Radio – Television Station	CanTho	CanTho1, CanTho2, CanTho3	Can Tho City People's Committee
6	Da Nang Newspaper & Radio – Television	DNRT	DNRT1, DNRT2	Da Nang City People's Committee
7	Dak Lak Newspaper & Radio – Television	DRT		People's Committee of Dak Lak Province
8	Dien Bien Newspaper & Radio – Television	ĐTV		People's Committee of Dien Bien Province
9	Dong Nai Newspaper & Radio – Television	ĐNNRTV	ĐNNRTV1, ĐNNRTV2, ĐNNRTV3	People's Committee of Dong Nai Province
10	Dong Thap Newspaper & Radio – Television	THĐT	THĐT1, Miền Tây - THĐT2	People's Committee of Dong Thap Province
11	Gia Lai Newspaper & Radio – Television	GTV		People's Committee of Gia Lai Province
12	Hanoi Newspaper & Radio - Television	Hanoi TV	H1, H2, HiTV, YouTV	Hanoi City People's Committee
13	Ha Tinh Newspaper & Radio – Television	BHT TV		People's Committee of Ha Tinh Province
14	Hai Phong Newspaper & Radio – Television	THP	THP, THP3	People's Committee of Hai Phong City
15	Ho Chi Minh City Newspaper & Radio - Television	HTV	HTV9, HTV7	Ho Chi Minh City People's Committee
16	Hung Yen Newspaper & Radio – Television	HY		People's Committee of Hung Yen Province
17	Khanh Hoa Newspaper & Radio – Television	KTV	KTV, KTV1	People's Committee of Khanh Hoa Province
18	Lai Chau Newspaper & Radio – Television	LTV		People's Committee of Lai Chau Province
19	Lang Son Newspaper & Radio – Television	LSTV		People's Committee of Lang Son Province
20	Lao Cai Newspaper & Radio – Television	THLC		People's Committee of Lao Cai Province
21	Lam Dong Newspaper & Radio – Television	LTV	LTV1, LTV2, BTV6 - Shopping 24h	People's Committee of Lam Dong Province
22	Nghe An Newspaper & Radio – Television	NaTV		People's Committee of Nghe An Province
23	Ninh Binh Newspaper & Radio – Television	NBTV		People's Committee of Ninh Binh Province
24	Phu Tho Newspaper & Radio – Television	PTV		Phu Tho Province People's Committee
25	Quang Ngai Newspaper & Radio – Television	QNgTV	QNgTV1, QNgTV2	People's Committee of Quang Ngai Province
26	Quang Ninh Newspaper & Radio – Television	QTV	QTV1, QTV3	People's Committee of Quang Ninh Province
27	Quang Tri Newspaper & Radio – Television	QTTV		People's Committee of Quang Tri Province
28	Son La Newspaper & Radio – Television	STV - SNews		People's Committee of Son La Province
29	Tay Ninh Newspaper & Radio – Television	TN (TayNinhTV)		People's Committee of Tay Ninh Province
30	Thanh Hoa Newspaper & Radio – Television	TTV		People's Committee of Thanh Hoa Province
31	Thai Nguyen Newspaper & Radio – Television	TN		People's Committee of Thai Nguyen Province
32	Hue Newspaper & Radio – Television	HUETV		People's Committee of Hue City
33	Tuyen Quang Newspaper & Radio – Television	TTV		People's Committee of Tuyen Quang Province
34	Vinh Long Newspaper & Radio – Television	THVL	THVL1, THVL2, THVL3, THVL4, THVL5	People's Committee of Vinh Long Province

== Pay TV channels ==
=== VTVCab ===
Name of channel	Content
ON Vie Giải Trí (ON Vie Entertainment)	Entertainment
ON Vie Dramas	Asian dramas
ON Phim Việt (ON Vietnamese Dramas)	Vietnamese dramas
ON Movies	Movies
ON E Channel	Entertainment
ON O2TV	Health
ON BiBi	Children
ON Kids	Children
ON Info TV	Financial
On Cine	Dramas
ON Style TV	Lifestyle
ON Music	Music
ON Trending TV	Entertainment for youth
ON V Family	Entertainment for women and family
ON Life	Life and explore
ON Sports	Sports
ON Sports +	Sports and entertainment
ON Sports News	Sports
ON Football	Football
ON Golf	Golf
ON Home Shopping	Shopping

=== SCTV ===
Channel name	Current content
SCTV Phim tổng hợp (SCTV General Dramas)	Vietnamese and Asian dramas
SCTV1	Comedy
SCTV2 TODAYTV	General entertainment
SCTV3 SEE TV	Children
SCTV4	Culture – society – general entertainment
SCTV5 SCJ TV Shopping	Shopping
SCTV6 FIM360	Dramas
SCTV7	Vietnamese artistic
SCTV8 VITV	Business and finance news
SCTV9	Asian dramas
SCTV10	Shopping
SCTV11	General entertainment
SCTV12	Travel – exploring
SCTV13	Entertainment for women and families
SCTV14 Kênh Phim Việt (Vietnamese Dramas Channel)	Vietnamese dramas
SCTV15 SSPORT2	Sports
SCTV16	Foreign movies
SCTV17 SSPORT	Sport
SCTV18	General entertainment for youth
SCTV19 CHANNEL T	New Age teens
SCTV20	Music
SCTV21 Việt Nam Ký Ức (Vietnamese Memories)	General entertainment
SCTV22 SSPORT1	Sports
SCTV4K	4K UHD channel featuring selected programs from other SCTV channels

=== Ho Chi Minh City Newspaper & Radio - Television ===
Channel name	Content
HTV1	Public information
HTV2 - Vie Channel	General entertainment
HTV3	Adolescents and children
HTV4	Educational and instructional
HTV5 - Bchannel	Eastern culture and Buddhism
HTV Thể Thao (HTV Sports)	Sports
HTVC Thuần Việt (HTVC Vietnamese)	Vietnamese culture and movies
HTVC Gia Đình (HTVC Family)	General entertainment for families
HTVC Phụ nữ (HTVC Women)	General entertainment for women
HTVC Phim (HTVC Film)	Series and films
HTVC Du Lịch Và Cuộc Sống (HTVC Travel And Lifestyle)	Travel and lifestyle
HTVC+ (HTVC Plus)	General Entertainment

== International channels ==
Channel name	Old name	Content	Broadcasters network	Content editing unit
ABC Australia	Australia Network A+		VTVCab, FPT, HTVC, SCTV, MyTV, ViettelTV	VTV
AFN	Asian Food Channel	Food channels	VTVCab, FPT, ViettelTV, HTVC, MyTV, SCTV	VTV
Animal Planet		Discovery	VTVCab, FPT, SCTV, MyTV, HTVC, ViettelTV	TTXVN
Arirang TV			VTVCab, FPT, SCTV, HTVC, MyTV, K+, AVG, ViettelTV	VTV
AXN		Action / Entertainment	VTVCab, SCTV, HTVC, FPT, MyTV, ViettelTV	TTXVN
BBC Earth		Discovery	VTVCab, FPT, SCTV, HTVC	TTXVN
BBC Lifestyle		Lifestyle	VTVCab, FPT, SCTV, HTVC	TTXVN
BBC News	BBC World; BBC World News	News	VTVCab, FPT, SCTV, HTVC, MyTV	VTV
Cartoonito	Boomerang	Cartoon	VTVCab, HTVC, K+, MyTV, FPT	TTXVN
Cartoon Network Cartoonito		Cartoon	VTVCab, SCTV, HTVC, MyTV, FPT, ViettelTV	TTXVN
CBeebies	VTV	Kids	VTVCab, HTVC, FPT, MyTV, SCTV, ViettelTV	TTXVN
Channel News Asia		News and Finance	VTVCab, SCTV, HTVC, K+, FPT, MyTV, AVG, ViettelTV	VTV
Cinemax	Max by HBO	Movies	VTVCab, SCTV, HTVC, FPT, MyTV	VTV
CNN International			VTVCab, SCTV, HTVC, FPT, MyTV, ViettelTV, ClipTV, K+, AVG	VTV
Discovery Asia	Discovery HD World	Discovery	VTVCab, SCTV, FPT, HTVC, MyTV, ViettelTV	TTXVN
Discovery Channel		Discovery	VTVCab, SCTV, HTVC, FPT, MyTV, ViettelTV	TTXVN
DMAX		Discovery	HTVC	TTXVN
DreamWorks		Cartoon	VTVCab, FPT	TTXVN
DW-TV			VTVCab, SCTV, HTVC, FPT, MyTV, AVG, ViettelTV, K+	VTV
France 24		French TV channel	VTVCab, SCTV, HTVC, FPT, MyTV, AVG, ViettelTV, K+	VTV
HBO		Movies	VTVCab, SCTV, HTVC, FPT, MyTV, ViettelTV	TTXVN
HGTV		Housing (Real Estate) and Investment	VTVCab, ViettelTV	Viettel Media
HISTORY		History and Discovery	VTVCab, HTVC, ViettelTV, SCTV	VOV
NHK World Japan	NHK World		VTVCab, SCTV, HTVC, FPT, MyTV, AVG, ViettelTV	VTV
KBS World		Korean News Channel	VTVCab, SCTV, FPT, HTVC, AVG, MyTV, ViettelTV	VTV
Outdoor Channel	National Geographic	Entertainment and sports	VTVCab, FPT, MyTV, ViettelTV, HTVC, SCTV	VTV
SPOTV		Sports	MyTV	VTC
SPOTV2		Sports	MyTV	VTC
TLC	Discovery Travel & Living	Discovery	VTVCab, SCTV, K+, HTVC, MyTV, FPT, ViettelTV	TTXVN
TV5 Monde Asie		French TV channel	VTVCab, SCTV, HTVC, K+, MyTV, FPT, ViettelTV, AVG	VTV
Warner TV		Entertainment	FPT, VTVCab, HTVC, MyTV, ViettelTV	TTXVN
Kix			VTVCab, FPT, MyTV, TV360, ClipTV, HTVC	VTV
Woman		Women		VTV
Box Movie 1		Movies		VTV
Hollywood Classics		Movies		VTV
Box Hits	Box Movie 2	Movies	MyTV	VTV
Music Box	Only Music	Music	MyTV	VTV
Love Nature 4K		Discovery	VTVCab	VOV

== Defunct channels ==
=== National broadcasting networks ===
Channel	Content	Agency	Note
VTC1	News – Politics – Generalist	VTC	Stopped broadcasting on 15 January 2025
VTC2	Science – Technology -Lifestyle	VTC	Stopped broadcasting on 15 January 2025
VTC3	Culture – Sports – Entertainment	VTC	Stopped broadcasting on 15 January 2025
VTC4	Fashion – Lifestyle	VTC	Stopped broadcasting on 15 January 2025
VTC5	Entertainment	VTC	Stopped broadcasting on 15 January 2025
VTC6	Information – Entertainment channel for the Northern Region	VTC	Stopped broadcasting on 15 January 2025
VTC7	Entertainment	VTC	Stopped broadcasting on 15 January 2025
VTC8	Information – Entertainment channel for the Southern Region	VTC	Stopped broadcasting on 15 January 2025
VTC9	Information – Entertainment channel for every Vietnamese families	VTC	Stopped broadcasting on 15 January 2025
VTC10	Vietnamese Culture	VTC	Stopped broadcasting on 15 January 2025
VTC11	Channel for children and family	VTC	Stopped broadcasting on 15 January 2025
VTC12	Entertainment (Stopped broadcasting on 24 January 2024)	VTC	Stopped broadcasting on 15 January 2025
VTC13	Music channel. Part of its airtime is used for programmes in 4K definition (Stopped broadcasting on 24 January 2024).	VTC	Stopped broadcasting on 15 January 2025
VTC14	Weather – Environment – Lifestyle	VTC	Stopped broadcasting on 15 January 2025
VTC16	Agriculture – Rural – Farmer	VTC	Stopped broadcasting on 15 January 2025
VOVTV	Culture – Tourism	Voice of Vietnam	Stopped broadcasting on 15 January 2025
VNEWS	News – Politics – Generalist	Center for Television News	Stopped broadcasting on 15 January 2025
Assembly TV	News – Politics – Generalist	Office of the National Assembly (Note: Before 2018, this channel was managed by Voice of Vietnam.)	National's essential TV channel. To stop broadcasting on 1 January 2025.
People TV	News – Politics – Generalist	People newspaper	The nation's essential TV channel
VTV Huế	Generalist	VTV Center of Huế	Regional channel for viewers in the Northern Central of Vietnam. The studio is located in Huế city. In 2016, this channel, together with VTV Da Nang and VTV Phu Yen, merged to create the new VTV8 for the Central and Central Highlands region.
VTV Da Nang	Generalist	VTV Center of Da Nang	Regional channel for viewers in the central part of the Central region of Vietnam. The studio is located in Da Nang city. In 2016, this channel, together with VTV Da Nang and VTV Phu Yen, merged to create the new VTV8 for the Central and Central Highlands region.
VTV Phu Yen	Generalist	VTV Center of Phu Yen	Regional channel for viewers in the Southern Central of Vietnam. The studio is located in Phu Yen province. In 2016, this channel, together with VTV Da Nang and VTV Phu Yen, merged to create the new VTV8 for the Central and Central Highlands region.
VTV Can Tho 1	Generalist	VTV Center of Can Tho	Regional channel for viewers in the Southwestern of Vietnam. The studio is located in Can Tho city. Later, this channel merged with the Southeastern region center in 2016. The newly created VTV Can Tho in October 2022 is considered as the successor of VTV Can Tho 1.
VTV Can Tho 2	Regional channel for Khmer-speaking viewers	VTV Center of Can Tho	Regional channel for the Khmer-speaking viewers in the Southwestern of Vietnam. The studio is located in Can Tho city. In 2016, this channel was renamed to VTV5 Southwest.
VTV6	Youth channel	Vietnam Television	Replaced with VTV Can Tho from October 10, 2022, it is expected that VTV6 will be relaunched as a sports channel from June 8, 2026.

=== K+ ===
K+ ceased broadcasting on January 1, 2026.

Channel name	Content
K+ CINE	Movies
K+ ACTION	General entertainment
K+ SPORT 1	Top sport
K+ SPORT 2	General sport
K+ KIDS	Children-oriented
K+ LIVE 1	Sports. These channels are exclusively on K+ app.
K+ LIVE 2	Sports. These channels are exclusively on K+ app.
K+ LIVE 3	Sports. These channels are exclusively on K+ app.

=== Local stations and pay TV channels ===
In the past, some provincial radio and television stations have piloted the second, third, and second programs. Most of these channels mainly relay programs from Vietnam Television Station and Ho Chi Minh City Radio and Television Station and foreign TV channels. These TV channels only broadcast for a short time, or only broadcast within the province.

Channel name	Owner	Content	Note
LSTV2	Lang Son Radio – Television		
TBTV (THTB)	Thai Binh Radio - Television		
THVL8, THVL3	Vinh Long Radio - Television		Relayed VTV3 and VTV6
TTV2 (TTV11 TayNinhTV/TTV/THTN)	Tay Ninh Radio - Television		
THD (HDTV), THD1 (HDTV1), THD2 (HDTV2)	Hai Duong Radio – Television		Relayed VTV3, THD2 stop broadcasting, in THD1 change to from THP3
HGTV (HTV)	Ha Giang Radio - Television		
HGTV (THHG)	Hau Giang Radio - Television		Currently of THTPCT2 (CanTho2)
THHN (HANAM)	Ha Nam Radio - Television		
THGL (GTV/GRT)	Gia Lai Radio - Television		
TN2	Thai Nguyen Radio – Television		
TBK (BTV)	Bac Kan Radio - Television		
LA34 (THLA)	Long An Radio - Television		This TTV1 to change from TN (TayNinhTV)
VP (VPTV)	Vinh Phuc Radio - Television		
VTP	Vinh Phu Radio - Television		
KG-PTTH (THKG10/KTV10), KG1-PTTH	Kien Giang Radio - Television		Currently of ATV1 and ATV3
QBTV	Quang Binh Radio - Television		Currently of QTTV
QRTV (QTV)	Quang Tri Radio - Television		
CTV2, CTV8, CTV12	Ca Mau Radio – Television		
ĐNRTV4 (ĐN4-RTV), ĐNRTV9 (ÐN9-RTV)	Dong Nai Radio – Television		
STV	Song Be Radio - Television		
YTV	Yen Bai Radio - Television		
NTV	Nam Đinh Radio - Television		
NTV (TNT)	Ninh Thuan Radio - Television		Currently of KTV1
PTD	Dak Nong Radio - Television		Currently of LTV3
PTP	Phu Yen Radio - Television		
PTQ2	Quang Ngai Radio – Television		
STV1 (THST/STV), STV2, STV3	Soc Trang Radio – Television		This channel later merged with STV2 and STV3, last shutdown STV1 and change of to THTPCT3 (CanTho3)
QTV2	Quang Ninh Radio – Television		Relayed VTV2
QRT	Quang Nam Radio – Television		
THTG (TTV), THTG2	Tien Giang Radio – Television		Relayed HTV7 on the channel 12 UHF frequency of Can Tho
THBT (BTV)	Ben Tre Radio - Television		
THTV, THTV2	Tra Vinh Radio - Television		This shutdown channel of THTV2
THCT3	Can Tho Radio – Television		Relayed HTV7
NBTV+	Ninh Binh Radio – Television		Relayed VCTV2, then VTV3
ATV2	An Giang Radio – Television	Khmer-speaking channel	
TRT (TRT1), TRT2	Thua Thien Hue Radio – Television		
KTV2	Khanh Hoa Radio – Television	Culture-sports and entertainment channel	Broadcast on VTV2 frequency in Khanh Hoa, 2009–2010
BPTV1, BPTV2, BPTV3, BPTV4, BPTV5, BPTV6, BPTV25	Binh Phuoc Radio – Television		Broadcasting to 2008, excert for the channel BPTV4, BPTV5, BPTV6 and BPTV25
BGTV (BBS/BG)	Bac Giang Radio - Television		
BLTV (BTV/THBL)	Bac Lieu Radio - Television		
KRT	Kon Tum Radio - Television		Currently of QNgTV2
HTV	Ha Bac Radio - Television		
HTV	Hai Hung Radio - Television		
HTV	Ha Tay Radio - Television		Currently of HanoiTV2
HBTV (HBS)	Hoa Binh Radio - Television		
BTV	Binh Dinh Radio - Television		Currently of GTV
BTV	Binh Thuan Radio - Television		
BTV	Bac Thai Radio - Television		
BTV	Bac Ninh Radio - Television		
BTV1, BTV2, BTV3, BTV4, BTV5, BTV6, BTV7, BTV8, BTV9, BTV10, BTV11	Binh Duong Radio – Television (Note: Từ ngày 01/10/2025, Đài PT-TH Bình Dương được chuyển đổi thành Trung tâm HTV Bình Dương.)		
BRT	Ba Ria - Vung Tau Radio - Television (Note: Từ ngày 01/10/2025, Đài PT-TH Bà Rịa – Vũng Tàu được chuyển đổi thành Trung tâm HTV Bà Rịa.)		Live broadcast of HTV Sports
H2 4K, ANTG	Hanoi Radio Television		
THP2 (THP+)	Hai Phong Radio - Television		The channel's control master broatcast THP3)
LTV3	Lam Dong Newspaper Radio - Television		Relayed LTV1 (starts 1 February 2025)
THMH	Minh Hai Radio - Television		
THCL	Cuu Long Radio - Television		
THHNN	Ha Nam Ninh Radio - Television		
THNT	Nghe Tinh Radio - Television		
THNB	Nghia Binh Radio - Television		
TNH	Nam Ha Radio - Television		
THPK	Phu Khanh Radio - Television		
THTH	Thuan Hai Radio - Television		
THHT	Ha Tuyen Radio - Television		
GLKT	Gia Lai/Kon Tum Radio - Television		
QCTV1	Quy Nhon Cable Television		Cable channel owned by Quy Nhon Cable Television (QCATV)
QCTV2	Quy Nhon Cable Television		Cable channel owned by Quy Nhon Cable Television (QCATV)
QCTV3	Quy Nhon Cable Television		Cable channel owned by Quy Nhon Cable Television (QCATV)
ARICO, ARICO Shopping, DRT-Arico	ARICO Cable Television – Song Thu		Cable channel of ARICO Cable Television – Song Thu in Da Nang
HCATV	Hanoi Cable TV	General entertainment	Owned by Hanoi Cable TV, produced by Hanoi Radio – Television Station
HTVC2		General entertainment	
Hanoicab 1 - Economic – cultural – social information		Economic - cultural - social information	BTS - HITV
Hanoicab 2 - Women Family		Women Family	TVM
Hanoicab 3 – World Security		World Security	STTV
Hanoicab 4 – MOV		Movies	MOV
Hanoicab 5 – TV Shopping		Shopping at home	BTS/HCATV5/Hanoicab 5 – VNK Home Shopping Hanoicab 5 – Sành Mua Shopping Vietstar Shopping
Hanoicab 6 – Movies		Movies	Phim Hay
NCTV	Nam Dinh Cable Television	General entertainment	Owned by Nam Dinh Cable Television
SCTV	Son La Cable Television		Owned by Son La Cable Television
EG Homeshopping	EG-VTVcab	Shopping channel	Owned by EG Cable Television in Hai Phong. Co-operated with VNK Homeshopping in Hanoi.
CTD1	Tay Do Cable Television	General entertainment	
CTD2	Tay Do Cable Television	General entertainment	
THPC	Hai Phong Cable Television		
VTC	Ba Ria – Vung Tau Cable Television		Co-operated with Vietnam Digital Television.
DTC, HTC, TVTC, BTTC, BTC, BPTC, STC	affiliated with HTVC until 2013, and VTVcab since 2014		Later these cable companies were acquired by VTVcab.
KTVC	Nha Trang Cable Television		Cable channel of Nha Trang Cable Television
PQCTV			Phu Quoc Cable TV's own channel
BCTV	Binh Duong Cable Television		Operated by Binh Duong Cable Television
NA-VCTV	Nghe An Cable Television	General entertainment	Operated by of Nghe An Cable Television
NTH			Operated by N.T.H Cable Television in Da Nang, Phu Yen, Dak Lak, Dak Nong and Lam Dong.
HDCTV	Hai Duong Cable Television	Informations about its services and promotions.	Operated by Hai Duong Cable Television (now VTVcab Hai Duong)
TCTV, TNCTV, BGCTV, BNCTV, HYCTV, VCTV, LCTV, HTCab/HT-VCTV, CCTV			Private channel of Cable TV Thai Binh, Thai Nguyen, Bac Giang, Bac Ninh, Hung Yen, Vinh Phuc, Lao Cai, Lai Chau, Ha Tinh, Cam Pha. Most of them are in co-operated with VCTV/VTVcab.
CTN			Private channel of Cable Television Central Highlands.
DCTV			Private channel of Dong Do – Bac Ninh Cable Television
GCTV/CCN			Private channel of Highland Cable TV
OneTV, FPT Play TV MyTV, MyTV HD Pladio, Keeng, LifeTV, VOD Phim HD, VOD Cartoon HD			Informations about its services and promotions.
TCTV	affiliated with VCTV/VTVcab in Thanh Hoa province		Informations about its services and promotions. Operated by Thanh Hoa Cable Television
KCTV			Private channel of Kien Giang Cable Television
BCATV			Private channel of Bac Lieu Cable Television
Giata			Private channel of Giata cable television
CCTV			Central Central Internet and Cable TV channel
CBCTV			Private channel of Cao Bang Cable TV Center
HNCATV			Private channel of Ha Nam Cable TV
Ca Mau Online			Private channel of Ca Mau cable TV.
HBCTV	affiliated with VCTV/VTVcab in Hoa Binh province		Operated by Hoa Binh Cable TV
LCTV			Private channel of Mau Son cable TV
THVLC, LAC, ACTV, TGCTV/TTC, TNC, ĐNC, TQCTV, TQTCab, ĐBCTV, HGTC, HTCTV, Hoi An CATV, QCTV, YBCTV, CMCTV			Private channel of Vinh Long, Long An, An Giang, Tien Giang, Tay Ninh, Dong Nai, Tuyen Quang, Dien Bien Cable TV, Hau Giang, Ha Tay, Hoi An, Quang Ninh, Yen Bai, Ca Mau
Astro Emotion		Movies	Asian dramas. Co-operated by BHD, Ho Chi Minh City Television and Astro.
HTVC-FBNC		News and Finance	Financial channel. Co-operated by FBNC and Ho Chi Minh City Television
MTV Vietnam		Music	Co-operated by IMC, Viacom and VTV.
Vietnamnet TV		News	2004–2020. Owned by Vietnamnet.
NCT		Music	Broadcast exclusively on their website
Youth TV		News	Broadcast exclusively on their website
Youth TV		News	Broadcast exclusively on their website
Zee Movies		Indian movies	Broadcast exclusively on HTVC
Assembly TV		Special news about the National Assembly and Sports event	A channel with a live broadcast of FIFA Women's World Cup 2023
VTVCab 11		Shopping	
VTVCab 14		Shopping	
HTVC – VGS Shop		Shopping	
HTV - Coop		Shopping	
HTVC Ca Nhạc		Music	
VTVLive		General	
Revolutionary music			
Ethnic music			
Children's music			
Lyric Music			
Classic music			
Read books			
Children's music			
Southern music			
Soft music			
Customer's			

=== District stations channel ===
(Note: Does not include district radio and television stations that only have radio function)

In addition to operating local radio and television stations, there are also district and provincial radio and television stations across the country. These stations usually broadcast their TV programs on the frequency channel that continues to re-broadcast the program channels of Vietnam Television Station at a time frame of the day before. Currently, these stations have stopped broadcasting television after completing Television digitization in each locality, only broadcasting programs on the Internet, social networks and on local television.

=== Army TV channels ===
Local military television channels were once broadcast in a number of provinces and municipalities in Vietnam, such as Ninh Bình, Hưng Yên,... via an analog terrestrial television system, from channels "13 VHF" to "20 UHF", which are managed by provincial military units. Since 2020, these channels have officially shut down.

== See also ==
- Television and mass media in Vietnam
- List of digital television stations in Vietnam
- List of analog television stations in Vietnam
