= Thời sự =

Vietnamese television news program

- Genre: News program
- Theme music composer: Do Hong Quan
- Country of origin: Vietnam
- Original language: Vietnamese

Production
- Executive producer: Nguyen Phuong Mai
- Producer: Vietnam Television
- Production locations: Hanoi, Vietnam
- Running time: 2–45 min

Original release
- Network: VTV1, VTV2, VTV3, VTV10, and other local channels On all VTV channels at Lunar New Year's Eve
- Release: 7 September 1970 – present

Thời sự (lit. 'News' or 'Current affairs' or 'Current events') is the main news program of Vietnam Television. First broadcast on September 7, 1970, it is one of the oldest and most watched programs in Vietnam. The program presents news and events under the view of the Government of Vietnam. along with an edited version for the hearing impaired available on VTVgo. On Lunar New Year each year, the program is broadcast live on all Vietnam Television channels.

The main version is broadcast live at 12:00 on VTV1, and at 19:00 daily on VTV1, VTV2, VTV3 and VTV10, and is rebroadcast on most local and national essential television channels in Vietnam. At various other times of the day, a shorter version called Tin Tức is broadcast. Editions of the program are also available on VTV's online platforms.

== History ==
Before Vietnam Television was born in 1970, news – documentaries was one of the genres produced by Vietnam Film Studio in the form of film reels. In 1956, the Documentary & News Film Studio separated from the Vietnam Film Studio to form the Central Documentary and Science Film Studio.

In 1968, the Television Film Studio was established, with the task of producing 16-mm television films to send to foreign television stations to propagate the situation during wartime in Vietnam. Also from that time, foreign television crews were invited and guided to operate and prepare necessary material and technical foundations for the construction of a complete radio-television studio and a radio-television industry to serve the domestic propaganda work in the future.

In 1970, Thời sự was one of the first programs in the first experimental television broadcast of Voice of Vietnam. From that day, the official genre of television news was born. Since then, News has always been a part of the television program every night, usually starting at 19:00. Initially, as there was no storage device at that time, Thời sự was broadcast live, but later editions were pre-recorded. Thời sự was broadcast after the children's program The Little Flowers.

Along with additional broadcasts in the morning and afternoon, news bulletins were also expanded. When the channel VTV2 was formed in 1990, Thời sự was broadcast on both channels in the evening broadcast. The 19:00 edition on VTV2 was broadcast for the following years until 2001.

In October 1997, Thời sự began to be broadcast live, and was simulcast on VTV1 and VTV3 at 19:00 daily. In addition to the main version, there are also Domestic News and International News, broadcast in the morning on VTV1, and the midday news, first broadcast on VTV2 and rebroadcast on VTV3 in the afternoon.

In 2002, along with the expansion of VTV1's broadcast time from 05:30 to 24:00 daily, VTV rearranged its newscasts. At this time, VTV has news at 09:00, 12:00, 16:00, 23:00 on VTV1; at 19:00 on VTV1, VTV3 and 22:00 on VTV2.

On October 10, 2003, The News for the Impaired Hearings broadcast its first edition on VTV2 at 22:00. In addition to the 19:00 edition being rebroadcast, there were on-screen subtitles for the deaf. From April 1, 2011, the form of expression was changed to sign language interpretation and maintained until now.

On June 15, 2011, VTV1 started broadcasting 24/7. The network has broadcast teletext-style bulletins updating domestic and international information at the top of every hour from 00:00 to 04:00 every day, with a duration of 10 minutes.

On January 22, 2012, Thời sự was broadcast from a new studio with modern technology at the new Program Production Technical Center. Sub-news bulletins at various times of the day were also broadcast interlaced in the following years.

Since December 30, 2013, Thời sự is hosted by two anchors.

On July 3, 2023, the Hourly News edition at 00:00 and 04:00 has been discontinued.

As of September 5, 2023, the Early Hour News edition at 17:00 has stopped broadcasting after more than 4 years of broadcasting and has been replaced by the programme Message from the Doctor broadcast every Monday to Friday weekly & Vietnamese Diary broadcasts every Saturday & Sunday weekly.

As of May 4, 2025, the 19:00 edition of Thời sự returned to broadcast live on channel VTV2, replacing dramas on this time slot.

== Main content ==
Similar to the news program in other socialist countries such as Xinwen Lianbo of China Central Television or Vremya of Central Television Station of the Soviet Union, Thời sự reports news that are aligned with the viewpoint of the Vietnamese government. The program often covers the visits of foreign politicians, visits abroad of central leaders, large conferences and forums, public press releases and announcements through meetings of the Party and authorities. Many important political news in the country and in the world are also covered.

Besides the main content, News also has segments such as:

- Sports 24/7: Started broadcasting from March 1, 2005, reporting on sports news both in Vietnam and abroad.
- Images of Life: A segment right before the weather forecast, showcasing lives of ordinary citizens in various parts of Vietnam.

== Editions ==
=== Edition before 1997 ===
VTV News before 1997 was broadcast after the program Little Flowers in the morning, afternoon and evening daily in a pre-recorded form on VTV1 and VTV2 until September 1997.

=== Main editions ===
==== News at 19:00 ====
The main version began to air when VTV3 broadcast the evening program in October 1997, broadcast live at 7:00 PM ICT daily on VTV1 and VTV3, with anchors covering domestic news. The first information in the program is usually the activities of the Party, the State, the National Assembly, and the Government on major economic and policy issues. The program also reflects the official positions of the Communist Party of Vietnam. Other important stories and international news are often placed at the end of the program or interspersed with domestic news. Occasionally, the program will also feature a special section devoted to prominent domestic issues, presented by another correspondent. The 19:00 news is rebroadcast on VTV2 at 22:00, with sign language interpretation.

A program with this structure usually lasts between 40 and 45 minutes. However, on occasions of a major event, the program is sometimes lengthened to 100 minutes or more. The record for the longest broadcast length of the program is at 108 minutes, on January 26, 2021, covering the opening of the 13th Congress of the Communist Party of Vietnam.

==== News at 12:00 ====
The 12:00 edition has only one anchor, and runs from 20 to 25 minutes. Using the main visuals used in the 19:00 version, from December 2016 the show was recorded and broadcast in a virtual studio and the anchor will usually stand instead of sitting like the 19:00 version.

Before 2002, the noon news was broadcast on channel VTV2 at 12:00 and replayed on VTV3 in the afternoon.

==== News headlines ====
Short version of Thời sự usually broadcast at 08:00, 09:00, 11:00, 16:00, 23:00; the compilation version of news being aired during the day airs at about 19:55/20:00 immediately after the broadcast of 19:00 News with a duration of 2 to 15 minutes. This version features a single host when it airs between 08:00 and 23:15, using the same ident and visuals as the 12:00 and 19:00 versions, but shorter and the title is simply known as Tin tức. For the edition aired 50 minutes apart between 00:00 and 04:10 there will be no anchors, instead, news sections are being reported in the form of pictures and text on the screen, using a short version of the ident.

== Broadcast ==
All time frames listed below are local time.

=== Main editions ===
==== Live broadcast ====
- VTV1 at 12:00 daily.
- VTV1, VTV2, VTV3, VTV10 at 19:00 daily. Simultaneously broadcast on most local television stations of Vietnam and People's Public Security Television.
- On all VTV channels at 19:00 at Lunar New Year's Eve.

===== Previous =====
- VTV5 at 19:00 daily.
- Relay on channels of Vietnam Cable Television:
  - VCTV1.
  - VCTV5.
  - VCTV9.
  - VCTV10.
  - VCTV15 – Invest TV.
- Relay on regional channels of Vietnam Television Station: VTV Can Tho, VTV Da Nang, VTV Hue, VTV Phu Yen and VTV9.
- Relay on VTC Digital Television channels: VTC1, VTC8 at 19:00; replay on VTC9 after 23:00.

==== Replay ====
- VTV2 at 22:00 every day, with Sign Language for the hearing impaired.
- VTC9 – Lets Viet at 23:30 everyday.
- THTPCT at 23:00 every day.

=== Top-of-the-hour edition ===
- VTV1 under the name News or Headlines at 08:00, 09:00, 11:00, 16:00, 19:55/20:00 and 23:00 daily, 17:00 ended broadcasting from September 5, 2023.

=== Brief edition ===
- VTV1 at 00:00, 01:00, 02:00, 03:00, 04:00 daily, ended broadcasting from July 3, 2023.

== Presenters ==
=== Current ===
- Nguyen Tien Anh
- Nguyen Huu Bang
- Nguyen Tuan Duong
- Tran Minh Trang
- Hoang Linh Thuy
- Chau Phuong Thao
- Nguyen Minh Trang
- Tran Quoc Anh

==== 12:00 news ====
- Minh Khue
- Van Ly
- Dan Le
- Xuan Son
- Chu Linh
- Thanh Lan
- Thuy Linh
- Ngoc Diep
- Viet Hai

== See also ==
- News program
- Television and mass media in Vietnam

=== News programs of the same genre ===
- Aktuelle Kamera, Deutscher Fernsehfunk
- Po sveta i u nas, Bulgarian National Television
- Xinwen Lianbo, China Central Television
- Vremya, Channel One Russia
