= List of analog television stations in Vietnam =

Following are the analog television stations in the provinces and territories of Vietnam, divided by regions in the country.

As of 28 December 2020, analog television stopped broadcasting nationwide due to the government's digitization roadmap. Previously, analog television in Vietnam was mostly broadcast on the VHF band (from channel 6 to channel 12) and the UHF band (from channel 21 to channel 62). Only a few stations broadcast below R6 VHF, including R3 VHF in Tam Dao, Can Tho (CT3, relay HTV7), and HCMC (OPT1).

== VTV Vietnam Channels ==
The list below includes the main broadcasting stations. The order of the provinces is based on each region, from North to South.

=== VTV1 ===
Province / City	Frequency channel (UHF/VHF)	Main transmitter	Frequency channel 2 (UHF/VHF)	2nd station	References
Lào Cai	12	Đài PTTH Lào Cai, TP Lào Cai			
Lai Châu	6	Đài PTTH Lai Châu	7 (cũ)	Đài PTTH Lai Châu (TP.Điện Biên cũ)	
Yên Bái	6 (cũ) ➡ 10	Đài PTTH Yên Bái			
Điện Biên	7	Đài PTTH Điện Biên			
Sơn La	8	Đài PTTH Sơn La			
Hòa Bình	31	Đài PTTH Hòa Bình			
Hà Giang	8	Đài PTTH Hà Giang – Trung tâm phát sóng núi Cấm	7	Trung tâm phát sóng Cổng trời Quản Bạ	
Cao Bằng	8	Đài PTTH Cao Bằng			
Bắc Kạn	10 (cũ)	Đài PTTH Bắc Kạn	12	Đài PTTH Bắc Kạn	
Lạng Sơn	12	Đài PTTH Lạng Sơn			
Tuyên Quang	38	Đài PTTH Tuyên Quang			
Quảng Ninh	33➡36	Đài PTTH Quảng Ninh	6	Đài TT-TH Móng Cái	
Hà Nội	11 ➡ 6 ➡ 9	Trung tâm phát sóng Giảng Võ (cũ) ➡ Trung tâm Truyền dẫn phát sóng Mễ Trì			
Hải Phòng	10	Đài PTTH Hải Phòng			
Hà Nam	12	Đài PTTH Hà Nam			
Thái Bình	32	Đài PTTH Thái Bình			
Vĩnh Phúc	3	Trạm phát sóng Tam Đảo			
Ninh Bình	27	Đài PTTH Ninh Bình			
Thanh Hóa	24	Đồi Quyết Thắng, TP Thanh Hóa			
Nghệ An	8	Đài PTTH Nghệ An			
Hà Tĩnh	21	Đài PTTH Hà Tĩnh			
Quảng Bình	12	Đài PTTH Quảng Bình			
Quảng Trị	6	Đài PTTH Quảng Trị			
Thừa Thiên – Huế	22	Trung tâm THVN tại Thừa Thiên Huế			
Đà Nẵng	12	Núi Sơn Trà; Trung tâm THVN tại TP Đà Nẵng			
Quảng Nam	23	Đồi An Hà, TP Tam Kỳ			
Quảng Ngãi	10	Đài PTTH Quảng Ngãi			
Bình Định	12	Đài PTTH Bình Định, TP Quy Nhơn			
Phú Yên	9	Núi Vũng Chua			
Khánh Hòa	12	Đài PTTH Khánh Hòa			
Ninh Thuận	6	Đài PTTH Ninh Thuận			
Bình Thuận	8	Đài PTTH Bình Thuận, TP Phan Thiết			
Kon Tum	8 ➡ 26	Đài PTTH Kon Tum			
Gia Lai	9	Núi Hàm Rồng			
Đắk Lắk	12	Đèo Hà Lan	10	Đài PTTH Đắk Lắk – TT phát sóng số 7	
Đắk Nông	21	Đài PTTH Đắk Nông			
Lâm Đồng	11	Trạm phát sóng Cầu Đất, TP Đà Lạt	8	Đài PTTH Lâm Đồng	
Bình Phước	8	Trạm phát sóng Bà Rá – Phước Long			
Tây Ninh	22	Trạm phát sóng Núi Bà Đen			
Bình Dương	21	Trạm phát sóng An Thạnh, TP Thuận An			
Bà Rịa – Vũng Tàu	38	Đài PTTH Bà Rịa – Vũng Tàu			
TP.Hồ Chí Minh	60	Saigon Centre, Quận 1	28 (trước 2002)	Đài Truyền hình TPHCM	
Đồng Nai	10	Núi Chứa Chan, Huyện Xuân Lộc			
Bến Tre	38	Đài PTTH Bến Tre			
Cần Thơ	46	Trung tâm THVN tại TP Cần Thơ			
Trà Vinh	45	Đài PTTH Trà Vinh			
Sóc Trăng	50	Đài PTTH Sóc Trăng			
Bạc Liêu	27	Đài PTTH Bạc Liêu			
Cà Mau	39	Đài PTTH Cà Mau			
Kiên Giang	30	Trạm phát sóng Núi Hòn Me – Huyện Hòn Đất	47	Đài Truyền thanh truyền hình TP Hà Tiên	
An Giang	24	Núi Cấm			

=== VTV2 ===
Province / City	Frequency channel (UHF/VHF)	Main transmitter	Frequency channel 2 (UHF/VHF)	2nd station	References
Lào Cai	23	TP Lào Cai			
Lai Châu	8	Đài PTTH Lai Châu	23	TP Điện Biên (tỉnh Lai Châu cũ)	
Yên Bái	12; 22 (cũ)	Đài PTTH Yên Bái			
Điện Biên	23	Đài PTTH Điện Biên			
Sơn La	23	Đài PTTH Sơn La			
Hòa Bình	28	Đài PTTH Hòa Bình			
Hà Giang	23	Đài PTTH Hà Giang – Trung tâm phát sóng núi Cấm	9 (phát chung với HGTV)	Trung tâm phát sóng cổng trời Quản Bạ	
Cao Bằng	6	Đài PTTH Cao Bằng			
Bắc Kạn	10	Đài PTTH Bắc Kạn			
Lạng Sơn	21	Đài PTTH Lạng Sơn			
Tuyên Quang	34	Đài PTTH Tuyên Quang			
Quảng Ninh	36	Đồi cột 5, Đài PTTH Quảng Ninh	11	Đài TT-TH Móng Cái	
Hà Nội	11	Trung tâm phát sóng Giảng Võ (cũ) ➡ Trung tâm Truyền dẫn Phát sóng Mễ Trì			
Hải Phòng	38	Đài PTTH Hải Phòng	44	Đài PTTH Hải Phòng	
Nam Định	25	Đài PTTH Nam Định			
Thái Bình	6	Đài PTTH Thái Bình			
Thanh Hóa	12	Đồi Quyết Thắng, TP Thanh Hóa			
Nghệ An	28 ➡ 6 -> 12	Đài PTTH Nghệ An			
Hà Tĩnh	26	Đài PTTH Hà Tĩnh			
Quảng Bình	10	Đài PTTH Quảng Bình			
Quảng Trị	32 ➡ 8	Đài PTTH Quảng Trị			
Thừa Thiên – Huế	25 ➡ 46	Đài PTTH Thừa Thiên – Huế			
Đà Nẵng	26	Trạm phát sóng Sơn Trà			
Quảng Nam	28	Đồi An Hà, TP Tam Kỳ			
Quảng Ngãi	8 -> 12	Đài PTTH Quảng Ngãi			
Bình Định	8	Núi Vũng Chua			
Phú Yên	23	Núi Chóp Chài			
Khánh Hòa	22	Đài PTTH Khánh Hòa			
Ninh Thuận	30 ➡ 27 (từ 2017)	Đài PTTH Ninh Thuận			
Bình Thuận	26	Đài PTTH Bình Thuận			
Kon Tum	8	Đài PTTH Kon Tum			
Gia Lai	7	Núi Hàm Rồng			
Đắk Lắk	31 ➡ 26	Đèo Hà Lan, TX Buôn Hồ	12	Đài PTTH Đắk Lắk (TT phát sóng số 7)	
Đắk Nông	24	Đài PTTH Đắk Nông			
Lâm Đồng	25	Cầu Đất			
Bình Phước	23	Trạm phát sóng Bà Rá – Phước Long			
Bình Dương	32 ➡ 46	Trạm phát sóng An Thạnh, TP Thuận An	40 (cũ)	Đài PTTH Bình Dương	
Bà Rịa – Vũng Tàu	61	Đài PTTH Bà Rịa – Vũng Tàu	48	Đài PTTH Bà Rịa – Vũng Tàu	
TP.Hồ Chí Minh	32	Đài Truyền hình TPHCM (trước 2010s)			
Bến Tre	40	Đài PTTH Bến Tre			
Cần Thơ	12	Trung tâm THVN tại TP Cần Thơ			
Sóc Trăng	50	Đài PTTH Sóc Trăng			
Bạc Liêu	21 ➡ 47	Đài PTTH Bạc Liêu			
Cà Mau	44	Đài PTTH Cà Mau			
Kiên Giang	32	Trạm phát sóng Núi Hòn Me, Huyện Hòn Đất			
An Giang	53	Trạm phát sóng Núi Cấm			

=== VTV3 ===
Province / City	Frequency channel (UHF/VHF)	Main transmitter	Frequency channel 2 (UHF/VHF)	2nd station	References
Lào Cai	6	Đài PTTH Lào Cai			
Lai Châu	12	Đài PTTH Lai Châu	7	Đài PTTH Lai Châu (tại TP Điện Biên cũ, trước 2004)	
Yên Bái	27 ➡ 22 (từ 2020)	Đài PTTH Yên Bái			
Điện Biên	12	Đài PTTH Điện Biên			
Sơn La	11	Đài PTTH Sơn La			
Hòa Bình	10 ➡ 33	Đài PTTH Hòa Bình			
Hà Giang	11 ➡ 6	Trạm phát sóng Núi Cấm – Đài PTTH Hà Giang	12	Trạm phát sóng cổng trời Quản Bạ	
Cao Bằng	23	Đài PTTH Cao Bằng			
Bắc Kạn	25	Đài PTTH Bắc Kạn			
Lạng Sơn	7	Đài PTTH Lạng Sơn			
Tuyên Quang	26	Đài PTTH Tuyên Quang			
Quảng Ninh	31	Đồi cột 5, đài PTTH Quảng Ninh	9	Đài TT-TH Móng Cái	
Hà Nội	22	Trung tâm phát sóng Giảng Võ (cũ) ➡ Trung tâm Truyền dẫn Phát sóng Mễ Trì			
Hải Phòng	8	Đài PTTH Hải Phòng	46	Đài PTTH Hải Phòng	
Nam Định	47 ➡ 50	Đài PTTH Nam Định			
Thái Bình	6 (chiều tối, đến 2010)	Đài PTTH Thái Bình			
Ninh Bình	12	Đài PTTH Ninh Bình			
Thanh Hóa	7	Đổi Quyết Thắng, TP Thanh Hóa			
Nghệ An	23	Đài PTTH Nghệ An			
Hà Tĩnh	12	Đài PTTH Hà Tĩnh			
Quảng Bình	23	Đài PTTH Quảng Bình			
Quảng Trị	30 ➡ 23 (từ 2017)	Đài PTTH Quảng Trị			
Thừa Thiên – Huế	7	Trung tâm THVN tại Thừa Thiên Huế			
Đà Nẵng	21	Trạm phát sóng Sơn Trà			
Quảng Nam	6 ➡ 33	Đồi An Hà, TP Tam Kỳ			
Quảng Ngãi	12	Đài PTTH Quảng Ngãi			
Bình Định	27	Núi Vũng Chua			
Phú Yên	11 ➡ 21	Núi Chóp Chài			
Khánh Hòa	6	Đài PTTH Khánh Hòa			
Ninh Thuận	23	Đài PTTH Ninh Thuận			
Bình Thuận	28	Đài PTTH Bình Thuận			
Kon Tum	23	Đài PTTH Kon Tum			
Gia Lai	25	Núi Hàm Rồng			
Đắk Lắk	38	Đài PTTH Đắk Lắk – TT phát sóng số 7	28	Đèo Hà Lan	
Đắk Nông	27 -> 6	Đài PTTH Đắk Nông			
Lâm Đồng	9	Trạm phát sóng Cầu Đất, TP Đà Lạt			
Bình Phước	6➡35➡12 (từ 2014)	Trạm phát hình Bà Rá			
Bình Dương	28	Trạm phát sóng An Thạnh, TP Thuận An			
Bà Rịa – Vũng Tàu	24	Đài PTTH Bà Rịa – Vũng Tàu			
TP.Hồ Chí Minh	62	Saigon Centre, Quận 1	21	Đài Truyền hình TPHCM	
Bến Tre	47	Đài PTTH Bến Tre			
Cần Thơ	49 ➡ 6	Trung tâm THVN tại TP Cần Thơ	10	Trung tâm THVN tại TP Cần Thơ	
Sóc Trăng	10	Đài PTTH Sóc Trăng			
Bạc Liêu	21	Đài PTTH Bạc Liêu			
Cà Mau	42	Đài PTTH Cà Mau			
Kiên Giang	28	Trạm phát sóng Hòn Me, huyện Hòn Đất			
An Giang	41	Trạm phát sóng Núi Cấm			

=== VTV4 ===
Province / City	Frequency channel (UHF/VHF)	Main transmitter	References
Hà Nội	2	Trung tâm phát hình Giảng Võ (cũ)	2000s – 2010s

=== VTV5 ===
Province / City	Frequency channel (UHF/VHF)	Main transmitter	References
Lai Châu	25	Đài PTTH Lai Châu	
Hà Nội	4	Trung tâm phát hình Giảng Võ (cũ)	2000s – 2010s
Quảng Nam	33	Đài PTTH Quảng Nam	
Kon Tum	38	Đài PTTH Kon Tum	
Đắk Lắk	6; 38	Đèo Hà Lan; TT phát sóng số 7 – Đài PTTH Đắk Lắk	
Lâm Đồng	22; 28	Đài Truyền thanh – Truyền hình Di Linh	

=== VTV6 ===
Province / City	Frequency channel (UHF/VHF)	Main transmitter	References
Lào Cai	25 ➡ 27	Đài PTTH Lào Cai	
Điện Biên	10 ➡ 8	Đài PTTH Điện Biên	
Hòa Bình	10	Đài PTTH Hòa Bình	
Bắc Kạn	33	Đài PTTH Bắc Kạn	
Lạng Sơn	33	Trạm phát sóng Mẫu Sơn	
Hà Nội	54	Trung tâm phát hình Giảng Võ (cũ) ➡ Trung tâm Truyền dẫn phát sóng Mễ Trì	
Nam Định	53	Đài PTTH Nam Định	
Thanh Hóa	40	Đồi Quyết Thắng, TP Thanh Hóa	
Nghệ An	43	Đài PTTH Nghệ An	
Hà Tĩnh	9	Núi Thiên Tương	
Thừa Thiên Huế	41	Trung tâm THVN tại Thừa Thiên Huế	
Đà Nẵng	47	Trạm phát sóng Sơn Trà	
Bình Định	10	Núi Vũng Chua, Bình Định	
Phú Yên	41	Núi Chóp Chài, TP Tuy Hòa	
Đắk Nông	12	Đài PTTH Đắk Nông	
Đắk Lắk	38	Trung tâm phát sóng số 7, Đài PTTH Đắk Lắk	
Bình Dương	48	An Thạnh, Thuận An	
TP Hồ Chí Minh	48	Saigon Centre, Quận 1	
Cần Thơ	58 ➡ 22	Trung tâm THVN tại Cần Thơ	

=== Kênh khu vực ===
The list below includes only master stations and playback stations set by regional channels.

Province / City	Channel(s)	Frequency channel (UHF/VHF)	Main transmitter	Frequency channel 2 (UHF/VHF)	2nd transmitter	References
Thừa Thiên Huế	VTV Huế	7 ➡ 9	Trung tâm Truyền hình Việt Nam tại TP.Huế	25		
Đà Nẵng	VTV Đà Nẵng	9	Trạm phát hình Sơn Trà; Trung tâm THVN tại TP. Đà Nẵng			
Kon Tum	VTV Đà Nẵng (DVTV)	9	TP Kon Tum			
Gia Lai	VTV Đà Nẵng (DVTV)	12	Núi Hàm Rồng			
Đắk Lắk	VTV Đà Nẵng (DVTV)	11	TP Buôn Ma Thuột			
Phú Yên	VTV Phú Yên	7	Núi Chóp Chài			
Lâm Đồng	VTV9, VTV Đà Nẵng	34	TP Đà Lạt	30		
TP.Hồ Chí Minh	VTV9	42	Saigon Centre (Quận 1)			
Cần Thơ	VTV Cần Thơ 1, VTV Cần Thơ 2	6 ➡ 49; 21	Trung tâm THVN tại TP.Cần Thơ	51	Trung tâm THVN tại TP.Cần Thơ	
An Giang	VTV Cần Thơ 1, VTV Cần Thơ 2	11	Núi Sam, Châu Đốc	56	Núi Sam, Châu Đốc	
Bà Rịa – Vũng Tàu	VTV Cần Thơ 1	26	Núi Thánh Giá, Côn Đảo			

== LocalTV Channels ==
The list below includes the local stations that broadcast at the main station. The order of the provinces is based on each region, from North to South.

Province / City	Channel(s)	Frequency channel (UHF/VHF)	Main transmitter	Frequency channel 2 (UHF/VHF)	2nd station	References
Lào Cai	THLC	9	Đài PTTH Lào Cai			
Lai Châu	LTV	10	Đài PTTH Lai Châu	9 (cũ)	Đài PTTH Lai Châu (TP. Điện Biên cũ)	
Yên Bái (Hoàng Liên Sơn cũ)	YTV	10 ➡ 6	Đài PTTH Yên Bái			
Điện Biên	ĐTV	9 ⏩ 8	Đài PTTH Điện Biên			
Sơn La	STV	6	Đài PTTH Sơn La			
Hòa Bình	HBTV	8; 12	Đài PTTH Hòa Bình; Dốc Cun			
Hà Giang (Hà Tuyên cũ)	HGTV	6 ➡ 11	Đài PTTH Hà Giang ➡ Đài phát xạ Núi Cấm	9 (phát chung với VTV2)	Đài Phát sóng Cổng trời Quản Bạ	
Cao Bằng	CRTV	11	Đài PTTH Cao Bằng			
Bắc Kạn	TBK	7	Đài PTTH Bắc Kạn			
Lạng Sơn	LSTV1; LSTV2	10 (tiếp VTV6)	Đài PTTH Lạng Sơn	9 (tiếp VTV2)	Đài PTTH Lạng Sơn	
Tuyên Quang (Hà Tuyên cũ)	TTV	8	Đài PTTH Tuyên Quang			
Thái Nguyên (Bắc Thái cũ)	TN1; TN2	7 (cũ) ➡ 32	TP. Thái Nguyên	7 (tiếp VTV3/HTV7)	TP. Thái Nguyên	
Phú Thọ (Vĩnh Phú cũ)	PTV	7	Đài PTTH Phú Thọ	36	Đài PTTH Phú Thọ	
Bắc Giang (Hà Bắc cũ)	BGTV (BBS)	8	Đài PTTH Bắc Giang	30	Đài PTTH Bắc Giang	
Quảng Ninh	QTV1, QTV2 (cũ), QTV3	12	Đồi cột 5, TP Hạ Long	36 (QTV2 tiếp VTV2); 7 (QTV3)	Đồi cột 5, TP Hạ Long	
Hà Nội (bao gồm Hà Tây cũ)	HanoiTV1, HanoiTV2, HanoiTV3	6; 49	Đài Phát sóng Giảng Võ; Trung tâm truyền dẫn phát sóng Mễ Trì	12 ➡ 24 (Hà Tây cũ)	Đài PTTH Hà Nội (Hà Đông)	
Hải Phòng	THP	10 ➡ 8 ➡ 28	Đài PTTH Hải Phòng			
Bắc Ninh	BTV	12 ➡ 37	Dốc Suối Hoa, TP Bắc Ninh	7; 52	Dốc Suối Hoa, TP Bắc Ninh	
Hà Nam	THHN (HANAM)	45	Đài PTTH Hà Nam	10 (tiếp VTV3 & HTV7)	Đài PTTH Hà Nam	
Hải Dương (Hải Hưng cũ)	THD1; THD2 (cũ)	8 (Hải Hưng) ➡7➡40	Đài PTTH Hải Dương	7 (tiếp VTV3)	Đài PTTH Hải Dương	
Hưng Yên	HY	7	Đài PTTH Hưng Yên	42	Đài PTTH Hưng Yên	
Nam Định	NTV	8	Đài PTTH Nam Định	37	Đài PTTH Nam Định	
Thái Bình	TBTV	6	Đài PTTH Thái Bình	35	Đài PTTH Thái Bình	
Vĩnh Phúc	VP	7 -> 12	Đài PTTH Vĩnh Phúc	41	Đài PTTH Vĩnh Phúc	
Ninh Bình	NBTV; NBTV+	39	Đài PTTH Ninh Bình	6 (tiếp VCTV2); 12 (tiếp VTV3)	Đài PTTH Ninh Bình	
Thanh Hóa	TTV	7 ➡ 9	Đồi Quyết Thắng, TP Thanh Hóa	62	Đồi Quyết Thắng, TP Thanh Hóa	
Nghệ An	NTV	11	Đài PTTH Nghệ An			
Hà Tĩnh	HTTV	6	Đài PTTH Hà Tĩnh	33	Núi Thiên Tượng, Hồng Lĩnh	
Quảng Bình	QBTV	7	Đài PTTH Quảng Bình			
Quảng Trị	QRTV	11	Đài PTTH Quảng Trị			
Thừa Thiên – Huế	TRT (TRT1), TRT2 (cũ)	12 ➡ 28	Đài PTTH Thừa Thiên Huế	12	Đài PTTH Thừa Thiên Huế	
Đà Nẵng	DanangTV1, DanangTV2	7 (DRT1) 24 (DRT2)	Núi Sơn Trà, Quận Sơn Trà			
Quảng Nam	QRT	31	Đồi An Hà, TP Tam Kỳ	35 (Bà Nà); 43	Bà Nà & Điện Bàn	
Quảng Ngãi	PTQ1; PTQ2	7	Đài PTTH Quảng Ngãi	12	Đài PTTH Quảng Ngãi	
Bình Định	BTV	6	Núi Vũng Chua, TP Quy Nhơn	22	Đài PTTH Bình Định, TP Quy Nhơn	
Phú Yên	PTP	37	Núi Chóp Chài, TP Tuy Hòa			
Khánh Hòa	KTV; KTV2	9	Đài PTTH Khánh Hòa	22 (trên tần số VTV2)	Đài PTTH Khánh Hòa	
Ninh Thuận	NTV	10	Đài PTTH Ninh Thuận			
Bình Thuận	BTV	12	Đài PTTH Bình Thuận			
Kon Tum	KRT	6	Đài PTTH Kon Tum			
Gia Lai	THGL	11	Núi Hàm Rồng			
Đắk Lắk	DRT	9	Đài PTTH Đắk Lắk	6	Đèo Hà Lan	
Đắk Nông	PTD	34	Đài PTTH Đắk Nông	10	Đài PTTH Đắk Nông	
Lâm Đồng	LTV	6	Đài PTTH Lâm Đồng	23, 27	Bảo Lâm, Đạ Tẻh	
Bình Phước (Sông Bé cũ)	BPTV1; BPTV2; BPTV3	25 ➡ 35 (từ 2014); 8 (trong năm 2004)	Trạm phát sóng Bà Rá, Phước Long	6 (BPTV2); 12 (tiếp VTV6)	Đài PTTH Bình Phước (TP Đồng Xoài); Trạm phát sóng Bà Rá, Phước Long	
Tây Ninh	TTV11	11	Đài PTTH Tây Ninh	11	Núi Bà Đen	
Bình Dương (Sông Bé cũ)	BTV1; BTV2	44	Đài PTTH Bình Dương	40	Đài PTTH Bình Dương	
Đồng Nai	ĐNRTV1; DNRTV2; DN3; DN4	12 ➡ 36 (DN1)	Đài PTTH Đồng Nai	12 (DN2); 33 (DN3); 34 (DN4); 31 (DN1, Thống Nhất); 45 (DN1, Núi Chứa Chan)	Đài PTTH Đồng Nai (trước 2009); Đài Truyền thanh Cẩm Mỹ	
Bà Rịa – Vũng Tàu	BRT	11	Núi Nhỏ, TP Vũng Tàu	41	Đài PTTH Bà Rịa – Vũng Tàu (TP Bà Rịa)	
Thành phố Hồ Chí Minh	HTV1, HTV2, HTV3, HTV4, HTV7, HTV9	7 (H7); 9 (H9)	Đài Truyền hình TPHCM	46 (H1); 30 (H2), 27 (H3); 35 (H4) (trước 2009)	Đài Truyền hình TPHCM; Tòa nhà Sunwah Tower (30)	
Long An	LA34	34	Đài PTTH Long An	47	Đài Truyền thanh huyện Vĩnh Hưng	
Tiền Giang	THTG	26	Đài PTTH Tiền Giang	12 (tiếp phát HTV7)	Đài PTTH Tiền Giang	
Bến Tre	THBT	23	Đài PTTH Bến Tre			
Đồng Tháp	THĐT1	29	Đài PTTH Đồng Tháp	11 (trước 1991)	Đài PTTH Đồng Tháp	
Vĩnh Long	THVL1, THVL2, THVL3	31	Đài PTTH Vĩnh Long	8; 10	Đài PTTH Vĩnh Long	
Cần Thơ	THTPCT	7➡ 11➡43	Công an quận Cái Răng (cũ) ➡ Đài PTTH Cần Thơ	3	Đài PTTH Cần Thơ	
Hậu Giang	HGTV	56	Đài PTTH Hậu Giang; Đài PTTH Cần Thơ (trước 2005)	55	Đài PTTH Hậu Giang (cũ)	
Trà Vinh	THTV	11➡35	Đài PTTH Trà Vinh			
Sóc Trăng	STV1, STV2, STV3	10 ➡ 21 ➡ 25 ➡ 22	Đài PTTH Sóc Trăng	50 ➡ 55; 10	Đài PTTH Sóc Trăng	
Bạc Liêu (Minh Hải cũ)	BLTV	33 ➡ 32	Đài PTTH Bạc Liêu	12	Đài PTTH Bạc Liêu	
Cà Mau	CTV1 (CTV8), CTV2 (CTV12)	8	Đài PTTH Cà Mau	12	Đài PTTH Cà Mau (tiếp phát chương trình VTV3/VTV5)	
Kiên Giang	KG PTTH (THKG10)	10	Trạm phát sóng núi Hòn Me, huyện Hòn Đất			
An Giang	ATV1, ATV2	36	Đài PTTH An Giang	8	Trạm phát sóng Núi Cấm	

== District Channels ==
The list below only includes TV channels in the districts of provinces and cities, sorted by region from North to South and the order of frequency channels (from 2 VHF – 62 UHF).

Province	District Channels name	Channels	Reference
Lào Cai	Bát Xát, Văn Bàn, Bắc Hà	7	
Lào Cai	Mường Khương, Bảo Yên	10	
Lào Cai	Bảo Thắng	11	
Lào Cai	Bắc Hà, Si Ma Cai, Văn Bàn	12	
Lào Cai	Sapa	22	
Lai Châu	Sìn Hồ, Nậm Nhùn, Phong Thổ	6	
Lai Châu	Mường Tè, Nậm Nhùn	7	
Lai Châu	Tân Uyên, Sìn Hồ	9	
Lai Châu	Mường La	10	
Lai Châu	Tam Đường	11	
Lai Châu	Than Uyên, Mường Tè	12	
Yên Bái	Trạm Tấu, Mù Cang Chải	10	
Yên Bái	Văn Chấn, Lục Yên, Nghĩa Lộ	11	
Yên Bái	Lục Yên, Yên Bình	12	
Yên Bái	Văn Chấn	28	
Điện Biên	Mường Lay	8	
Điện Biên	Mường Ảng	9	
Điện Biên	Điện Biên Đông, H.Điện Biên	10	
Điện Biên	Mường Nhé, Tuần Giáo, Mường Chà, Nặn Pô, Tủa Chùa	12	
Sơn La	Mộc Châu, Phù Yên	6	
Sơn La	Mường La	7	
Sơn La	Quỳnh Nhai, Vân Hồ, Mai Sơn	8	
Sơn La	Sông Mã	9	
Sơn La	Mộc Châu, Sốp Cộp, Vân Hồ	10	
Sơn La	Thuận Châu	11	
Sơn La	Thuận Châu	12	
Hòa Bình	Cao Phong, Lương Sơn, Tân Lạc	6	
Hòa Bình	Yên Thủy	7	
Hòa Bình	Tân Lạc & Lạc Thủy, Lạc Sơn	10	
Hòa Bình	Mai Châu, Kim Bôi	12	
Hà Giang	Bắc Quang, Mèo Vạc	6	
Hà Giang	Hoàng Su Phì, Yên Minh, Bắc Mê, Đồng Văn	10	
Hà Giang	Quang Bình	11	
Hà Giang	Vị Xuyên, Xín Mần	12	
Hà Giang	Bắc Quang	37	
Cao Bằng	Hà Quảng, Trùng Khánh	6	
Cao Bằng	Trùng Khánh	8	
Cao Bằng	Bảo Lạc, Hạ Lang, Thông Nông, Nguyên Bình	9	
Cao Bằng	Phục Hòa	10	
Cao Bằng	Trà Lĩnh	11	
Cao Bằng	Bảo Lâm, Hà Quảng	12	
Bắc Kạn	Pác Nậm	6	
Bắc Kạn	Ba Bể	7	
Bắc Kạn	Pác Nậm	8	
Bắc Kạn	Chợ Mới, Ngân Sơn	9	
Bắc Kạn	Chợ Đồn, Ba Bể	10	
Bắc Kạn	Chợ Đồn	11	
Bắc Kạn	Bạch Thông, Na Rì	12	
Lạng Sơn	Hữu Lũng	7	
Lạng Sơn	Lộc Bình, Chi Lăng	8	
Lạng Sơn	Cao Lộc	9	
Lạng Sơn	Văn Quan, Bắc Sơn, Bình Gia, Cao Lộc	10	
Lạng Sơn	Đình Lập	11	
Lạng Sơn	Chi Lăng	23	
Tuyên Quang	Sơn Dương	6	
Tuyên Quang	Yên Sơn	7	
Tuyên Quang	Hàm Yên	9	
Tuyên Quang	Chiêm Hóa, Na Hang, Lâm Bình	12	
Thái Nguyên	Võ Nhai	6	
Thái Nguyên	Đại Từ	8	
Thái Nguyên	Phú Lương	9	
Phú Thọ	Thanh Ba	6	
Phú Thọ	Cẩm Khê, Đoan Hùng	10	
Phú Thọ	Hạ Hòa, Thanh Sơn, Tam Nông, Yên Lập	12	
Bắc Giang	Yên Thế	8	
Bắc Giang	Yên Thế	10	
Bắc Giang	Sơn Động	10	
Bắc Giang	Lục Ngạn, Sơn Đông, Yên Dũng, Lục Nam	12	
Quảng Ninh	Hoành Bồ	8	
Quảng Ninh	Cẩm Phả, Đầm Hà	9	
Quảng Ninh	Cô Tô, Hải Hà, Vân Đồn, Uông Bí	10	
Quảng Ninh	Bình Liêu	11	
Quảng Ninh	Vân Đồn	12	
Quảng Ninh	Ba Chẽ	22	
Quảng Ninh	Móng Cái, Đông Triều	25	
Quảng Ninh	Tiên Yên	28	
Hà Nội	Làng Vạn Phúc	8	
Hà Nội	Ba Vì	10	
Hải Phòng	Cát Bà	6, 12	
Hải Phòng	Thủy Nguyên	7	
Hải Phòng	Bạch Long Vĩ	10	
Hải Dương	Kinh Môn	36	
Hải Dương	Chí Linh	12	
Vĩnh Phúc	Vĩnh Tường	6	
Nam Định	Ý Yên	10	
Nam Định	Giao Thủy	48	
Nam Định	Hải Hậu	55	
Ninh Bình	Yên Mô	4	
Ninh Bình	TP. Tam Điệp	7	
Ninh Bình	Nho Quan	55	
Thanh Hóa	Bỉm Sơn	4	
Thanh Hóa	Như Thành	6	
Thanh Hóa	Thạch Thành, Như Xuân, Quan Hóa	8	
Thanh Hóa	Bá Thước, Lang Chảnh, Quan Hóa, Đông Sơn	9	
Thanh Hóa	Cẩm Thủy	10	
Thanh Hóa	Như Thanh, Quan Sơn, Lang Chánh, Yên Định, Quan Hóa, Cẩm Thủy, Như Xuân, Mường Lát	11	
Thanh Hóa	Tĩnh Gia, Bá Thước, Thường Xuân, Như Xuân	12	
Thanh Hóa	Nga Sơn	25	
Nghệ An	Quỳ Hợp, Quế Phong	6	
Nghệ An	Kỳ Sơn	7	
Nghệ An	Diễn Châu, Quỳnh Lưu, Con Cuông, Anh Sơn	9	
Nghệ An	Quỳ Hợp, Quỳ Châu	10	
Nghệ An	Tương Dương	11	
Nghệ An	Nghĩa Đàn, TX Thái Hòa, Đô Lương	12	
Nghệ An	Tân Kỳ	21	
Hà Tĩnh	Cẩm Xuyên	5 -> 12	Dừng phát sóng từ cuối 2007.
Hà Tĩnh	Nghi Xuân	6	
Hà Tĩnh	Hương Khê, Can Lộc	7	
Hà Tĩnh	Hương Sơn	9	
Hà Tĩnh	Vũ Quang, Đức Thọ, Hương Khê	10	
Hà Tĩnh	Vũ Quang, Kỳ Anh	12	
Quảng Bình	Minh Hóa, Tuyên Hóa	7	
Quảng Bình	Tuyên Hóa	8	
Quảng Bình	Bố Trạch	9	
Quảng Trị	Hướng Hoá	7	
Quảng Trị	Đắk Rông	9	
Quảng Trị	Vĩnh Linh, Gio Linh	25	
Thừa Thiên Huế	A Lưới	6	
Thừa Thiên Huế	Nam Đông	9	
Thừa Thiên Huế	Phú Lộc	21	
Đà Nẵng	Hòa Vang	44	
Quảng Nam	Bắc & Nam Trà My, Nông Sơn	6	
Quảng Nam	Hội An, Duy Xuyên, Đại Lộc, Điện Bàn, Phước Sơn, Hiệp Đức	7	
Quảng Nam	Tiên Phước	8	
Quảng Nam	Đông Giang	9	
Quảng Nam	Quế Sơn	10	
Quảng Nam	Bắc Trà My, Tây Giang	11	
Quảng Nam	Nam Giang	12	
Quảng Nam	Đông Giang	37	
Quảng Nam	Núi Thành	47	
Quảng Nam	Thăng Bình	48	
Quảng Nam	Hội An	60	
Quảng Ngãi	6	Đức Phổ, Sơn Hà	
Quảng Ngãi	7	Sơn Tây	
Quảng Ngãi	8	Minh Long	
Quảng Ngãi	10	Lý Sơn	
Quảng Ngãi	11	Minh Long	
Quảng Ngãi	12	Trà Bồng, Minh Long	
Quảng Ngãi	22	Dung Quất	
Quảng Ngãi	26	Ba Tơ	
Quảng Ngãi	27	Bình Sơn	
Bình Định	Hoài Nhơn	8	
Bình Định	Vĩnh Thạnh	9	
Bình Định	Hoài Ân, An Nhơn	10	
Bình Định	An Lão	11	
Bình Định	Tây Sơn	21	
Bình Định	Vân Canh	26	
Bình Định	Tuy Phước	29	
Phú Yên	Sơn Hòa	6	
Phú Yên	Sông Cầu, Sông Hinh, Đồng Xuân	10	
Phú Yên	Đông Hòa	12	
Khánh Hòa	Cam Ranh, Vạn Ninh	6	
Khánh Hòa	Ninh Hòa, Cam Lâm	7	
Khánh Hòa	Vạn Ninh	8	
Khánh Hòa	Khánh Sơn	9	
Khánh Hòa	Cam Ranh	12	
Khánh Hòa	Khánh Vĩnh	26	
Khánh Hòa	Diên Khánh	30	
Ninh Thuận	Ninh Phước	10	
Ninh Thuận	Bác Ái	11	
Ninh Thuận	Ninh Hải	12	
Bình Thuận	Tánh Linh	6	
Bình Thuận	Phú Quý	8	
Bình Thuận	Bắc Bình	22	
Bình Thuận	Hàm Tân	28	
Bình Thuận	Đức Linh, Lagi	34	
Bình Thuận	Tuy Phong	35	
Kon Tum	Đắk Tô	7	
Kon Tum	Đắk Gieo, Ngọc Hồi	9	
Kon Tum	Kon Rẫy	10	
Kon Tum	Tu Mơ Rông, Đắk Hà, Kon Rẫy, Sa Thầy	11	
Kon Tum	Kon Plong, Sa Thầy	12	
Gia Lai	Ayun Pa, Đức Cơ, Chư Prong, Đắk Đoa	6	
Gia Lai	Krong Pa	7	
Gia Lai	Mang Yang, Đức Cơ	8	
Gia Lai	Chư Păh, An Khê, Chư Prông, Chư Sê	10	
Gia Lai	Kbang, Kong Chro	12	
Gia Lai	Ia Pa	21	
Gia Lai	Đắk Pơ	30	
Gia Lai	Chư Pưh	36	
Đắk Lắk	Buôn Hồ	6	
Đắk Lắk	Ea Súp, Krong Pắc	7	
Đắk Lắk	Krong Pak, Eah'Leo, Krong Bong, M'Drak, Buôn Hồ	8	
Đắk Lắk	Krong Nang, Lắk	10	
Đắk Lắk	Eakar	11	
Đắk Lắk	M'Drak	12	
Đắk Lắk	Krong Ana, Buôn Đôn	51	
Đắk Nông	Đắk R'Lấp, Đắk Mil	7	
Đắk Nông	Đắk Glong	8	
Đắk Nông	Đắk Mil	23	
Đắk Nông	Cư Jút	25	
Đắk Nông	Krong Nô, Đắk Glong	30	
Đắk Nông	Tuy Đức	36	
Lâm Đồng	Bảo Lộc	3	
Lâm Đồng	Lâm Hà, Đạm Bri, Đạ Huoai (cũ)	6	
Lâm Đồng	Lạc Dương	9	
Lâm Đồng	Bảo Lộc, Đạ Huoai, Lâm Hà, Cát Tiên	10	
Lâm Đồng	Cát Tiên, Đạ Tẻh	11	
Lâm Đồng	Đà Lạt, Đam Rông, Bảo Lâm	12	
Lâm Đồng	Đức Trọng	24	
Lâm Đồng	Di Linh, Đơn Dương	27	
Bình Phước	Bù Đăng, Lộc Ninh	10	
Bình Phước	Bù Gia Mập	32	
Bà Rịa Vũng Tàu	Côn Đảo	33	
An Giang	Tân Châu, Tịnh Biên	12	
An Giang	An Phú	38	
An Giang	Châu Đốc	48	
An Giang	Tri Tôn	58	
Kiên Giang	Phú Quốc	10	

== Other Channels ==
=== VTC ===
Province / City	Channel(s)	Frequency channel (UHF/VHF)	Broadcast location (main)	Frequency channel 2 (UHF/VHF)	Broadcast location (main)	Frequency channel 3 (UHF/VHF)	Broadcast location (main)	Frequency channel 4 (UHF/VHF)	Broadcast location (main)	Reference
Hà Nội	VTC1, VTC2 -> VTC7, VTC9, VTC5	29 ➡ 44 (từ 2014)	Vân Hồ	31 ➡ 46 (từ 2014)	Vân Hồ	33	Vân Hồ	43	Vân Hồ	
Nam Định	VTC9 ➡ VTC1	31	Đài PTTH Nam Định							
Thanh Hóa	VTC1, VTC7, VTC9	57	TP Thanh Hóa	52	TP Thanh Hóa	59	TP Thanh Hóa			
Quảng Bình	VTC1, VTC9	35	TP Đồng Hới	36	TP Đồng Hới					
Quảng Trị	VTC1, VTC9	53	TP Đông Hà	55						
Đà Nẵng	VTC1, VTC9	51	Trạm phát sóng Sơn Trà	53		55		58		
Lâm Đồng	VTC1, VTC9	51	Cầu Đất	53	Cầu Đất					
TP Hồ Chí Minh	VTC1/VTC5, VTC7, VTC9	60 ➡ 58 ➡ 54	Đồng Đen, Quận Tân Bình	52 ➡ 39		51				
Bình Dương	VTC1, VTC7, VTC9	25	Đài PTTH Bình Dương	38		52				
Cần Thơ	VTC1, VTC9	60	Quận Bình Thủy	61	Quận Bình Thủy					

=== HTV ===
Province / City	Channel(s)	Frequency channel (UHF/VHF)	Broadcast location (main)	References
Đắk Lắk	HTV7, HTV9	48, 51	Huyện M'Drak	
Lâm Đồng	HTV7, HTV9	21, 24	Cầu Đất (TP Đà Lạt), TP Bảo Lộc	
Hải Dương	HTV7, HTV9	6, 10	Đài PT-TH Hải Dương	
Bắc Ninh	HTV9, HTV7	32, 39	?	
Hải Phòng	HTV7, HTV9	21, 48	Đồi Thiên Văn?	
Điện Biên	HTV7	10	Đài PTTH Điện Biên	
Đà Nẵng	HTV7, HTV9	8, 24	Hòa Khánh Nam (kênh 8) Trạm phát sóng Sơn Trà (kênh 24)	
An Giang	HTV7, HTV9	3, 11, 56	Núi Sam	
Cần Thơ	HTV7, HTV9	3, 44, 48	Trung tâm THVN tại Cần Thơ	
Kiên Giang	HTV7, HTV9	23, 27	Đài Truyền thanh – Truyền hình Phú Quốc	
Quảng Trị	HTV7, HTV9	28, 36	khu vực Hướng Hóa	
Tây Ninh	HTV7, HTV9	7, 9	Núi Bà Đen	
Đồng Nai	HTV7, HTV9	4, 6	Núi Chứa Chan	
Cà Mau	HTV9	32	Đài truyền thanh huyện Trần Văn Thời	
Bình Thuận	HTV7, HTV9	6, 26	Đài PTTH Bình Thuận	Privated
Đắk Nông	HTV7, HTV9	6, 8	Đài PTTH Đắk Nông	Phát từ năm 2004
Thua Thien Hue	HTV9	3x	Thừa Thiên Huế Radio and Television stations	Phát sóng từ 2005

=== VOV ===
Province / City	Channel(s)	Frequency channel (UHF/VHF)	Broadcast location (main)	References
Hà Nội	VOVTV	38	Trạm phát sóng Mễ Trì	

== See ==
- Television and mass media in Vietnam
- List of television channels in Vietnam
