= Trần Tuấn Việt =

Vietnamese photographer (born 1983)

- Born: 1983 (age 42–43); Vinh, Nghệ An Province, Vietnam
- Education: National University of Civil Engineering
- Occupation: Photographer
- Years active: 2007–present

Trần Tuấn Việt (born 1983) is a Vietnamese photographer, known as "the man who brings Vietnam's images to the world". He is a contributing photographer for National Geographic and Google Arts & Culture, an online art and culture platform run by Google.

== Life and career ==
Trần Tuấn Việt was born in Vinh, Nghe An Province, in 1983. From 1998 to 2001, he studied at Vinh University's High School for the Gifted. He moved to Hanoi in 2001 and studied architecture at the Hanoi University of Civil Engineering from 2001 to 2006. In 2007, Viet started his career as a freelance photographer.

In 2015, he joined the photography community of the National Geographic Society, one of the largest photography communities in the world, and was recognized as the most successful Vietnamese photographer in this community. In September 2019, he became a contributing photographer of National Geographic's photo community, when this community shifted its focus to Instagram. He has contributed numerous photographs of Vietnam that have been featured across various platforms of National Geographic, including magazine, book, and almanac.

In 2016, Trần Tuấn Việt became a photographer for Getty Images and a member of Vietnam Association of Photographic Artists. In 2019, he joined the project "Wonders of Vietnam" by Google in collaboration with the Vietnam National Administration of Tourism, published on Google Arts & Culture.

In September 2024, Tran Tuan Viet's photography is featured in an exhibition named "Destination Vietnam", organized by the Ministry of Culture, Sports and Tourism (Vietnam), showcasing 93 artistic images that capture the beauty of Vietnam. This exhibition is part of the Vietnam Tourism - Cinema Promotion Program in Hollywood, California, United States, running from September 23 to 25, 2024.

Trần Tuấn Việt holds the role of judge for many major art competitions in Vietnam and globally.

== Awards ==
Year	Name	Organizer	Award
2017	The 9th International Art Photo Contest in Vietnam	Vietnam Association of Photographic Artists	Gold Medal
2017	Vietnam's National Photography Excellence Award	Vietnam Association of Photographic Artists	A Award
2018	15th Annual Smithsonian Magazine Photo Contest	Smithsonian Magazine	Winner - Travel Category
2018	Hamdan International Photography Award	H.H. Sheikh Hamdan Bin Mohammed Al Maktoum	Finalist
2019	Environmental Photographer of the Year	Chartered Institution of Water and Environmental Management	Honorable Mentions
2019	The 10th International Art Photo Contest in Vietnam	Vietnam Association of Photographic Artists	Honorable Mentions
2019	Travel Photographer of the Year	Travel Photographer of the Year Ltd.	Finalist
2019	Hamdan International Photography Award	H.H. Sheikh Hamdan Bin Mohammed Al Maktoum	Finalist
2020	Fun 2020 Photography Contest	Agora Awards	Winner
2020	Architecture 2020 Photography Contest	Agora Awards	Winner
2020	Hamdan International Photography Award	H.H. Sheikh Hamdan Bin Mohammed Al Maktoum	Finalist
2020	Eyes 2020 Photography Contest	Agora Awards	Winner
2021	18th Annual Smithsonian Magazine Photo Contest	Smithsonian Magazine	Reader's Choice Winner
2021	Travel Photographer of the Year	Travel Photographer of the Year Ltd.	Finalist
2021	Environmental Photographer of the Year	Chartered Institution of Water and Environmental Management	Finalist
2022	Minimalist Photography Awards	Minimalist Photography Awards	Finalist
2022	The Epson International Pano Awards	The International Pano Awards	Silver Award
2022	International Black & White Photography Contest	Monochrome Photography Award	Honorable Mentions
2023	Environmental Photographer of the Year	Chartered Institution of Water and Environmental Management	Finalist
2023	ColorPro Awards - RISE	ViewSonic	4th Finalist
2023	International Black & White Photography Contest	Monochrome Photography Award	Honorable Mentions
2024	Sony World Photography Awards	Word Photography Organisation	National Award
2024	Wikimedia Commons's Photo of the Year 2023	Wikimedia Commons	Winner
2024	Most Inspiring Travel Influencers of 2024	VNTravelLive Magazine	Winner
2025	Gen.T Leader of Tomorrow 2025	TatlerAsia	Winner

== Exhibitions ==
Year	Name	Location	Organizer	Type
2016	Hanoi's art photo exhibition	Hanoi, Vietnam	Vietnam Association of Photographic Artists	Group
2017	The 9th International Art Photo Contest in Vietnam	Hanoi, Vietnam	Vietnam Association of Photographic Artists	Group
2018	Session "Learning about Vietnam"	Hanoi, Vietnam	Ministry of Foreign Affairs (Vietnam) in Hanoi, Vietnam	Solo
2018	Youth Photography Award	Hanoi, Vietnam	Ministry of Culture, Sports and Tourism (Vietnam)	Group
2019	The 10th International Art Photo Contest in Vietnam	Hanoi, Vietnam	Vietnam Association of Photographic Artists	Group
2020	Travel Photographers of the Year	London, United Kingdom	Travel Photographers of the Year Ltd.,	Group
2020	World Water Day	Italy		Group
2021	"My Vietnam"	Sharjah, United Arab Emirates	Xposure International Photography Festival	Solo
2021	"Wonders of Vietnam"	Google Arts & Culture	Google	Online
2023	The 11th International Art Photo Contest in Vietnam	Hanoi, Vietnam	Vietnam Association of Photographic Artists	Group
2024	Sony World Photography Awards	London, United Kingdom Ho Chi Minh City, Vietnam Hanoi, Vietnam Berlin, Germany	Word Photography Organisation	Group
2024	Destination Vietnam	Los Angeles, California, United States	Ministry of Culture, Sports and Tourism (Vietnam)	Solo

== Televisions ==
Year	Channel	Program	Air Date	Role	Note
2017	VTV1	Cuộc sống thường ngày	17 May 2017	Guest	
2017	VTV4	Culture Mosaic	2 December 2017	Guest	
2017	VTC20	NetViet Stories		Guest	
2017	VTV1	Bản tình ca của đá	18 December 2017	Photographer	5 episodes
2018	Voice of Vietnam	Muôn màu cuộc sống		Guest	
2018	VTV6	Trên Từng Cây Số, season 1	5 May 2018	Photographer, Mentor	4 episodes
2018	VTV6	Thế hệ số	15 August 2018	Photographer	
2018	Nhân Dân TV	Tạp chí đối ngoại		Guest	
2018	VTV1	Bản tin VTV24		Guest	
2019	VTV3	Gameshow Sức nước ngàn năm	15 September 2019		
2019	VTV1	VTV24		Guest	
2019	VTV3	Chuyện đêm muộn	16 October 2019	Guest	
2019	VTV24	Bản tin		Guest	
2020	Vietnam News Agency TV	Bản giao hưởng xanh		Guest	
2020	VTV2	Cho ngày hoàn hảo	16 February 2020	Guest	
2020	VTV3	Gameshow Vui, khoẻ, có ích		Guest	
2020	VTV1	Việt Nam trong tôi Bản tình ca của đá		Photographer	5 episodes
2020	VTC10 – Đài Truyền hình Kỹ thuật số VTC	NetViet Stories		Guest	
2020	Nhân Dân TV	Gương mặt cuộc sống	30 October 2020	Photographer	
2020	VTV6	Thế hệ Số	12 December 2020	Guest	
2021	VTV2	Việt Nam trong tôi Bản tình ca của đá		Photographer	5 episodes
2021	Nhân Dân TV	Đối ngoại và Hội nhập	5 February 2021	Guest	
2021	Vietnam News Agency TV	Văn hoá toàn cảnh	1 April 2021	Guest	
2021	VTV3	Vui sống mỗi ngày		Guest	
2021	QPVN	Rubik Cuộc sống	5 April 2021	Guest	
2021	Ho Chi Minh City Television	Trần Tuấn Việt – Người đưa hình ảnh Việt Nam ra thế giới	15 December 2021	Guest	
2022	Discovery Channel	Dare to Ride, Episode 4	16 July 2022	Actor	
2022	VTV1	Thanh xuân tươi đẹp – 15/10/2022	15 October 2022	Guest	
2022	VTV3	Lời tự sự: Nhiếp ảnh gia Tuấn Việt		Guest	
2022	VTV3	Cà phê sáng – 19/07/2022	19 July 2022	Guest	
2022	VTV3	Chữ V diệu kỳ		Guest	
2022	VTV3	Cà phê sáng – 24/06/2022	24 June 2022	Guest	
2022	VTV3	Cà phê sáng – 09/02/2022	9 February 2022	Guest	
2022	Hanoi Radio Television	Hà Nội qua những thước phim trên Discovery		Guest	
2023	VTC	10 phút với nghệ sĩ: Trần Tuấn Việt – người đưa hình ảnh Việt Nam ra thế giới	15 January 2023	Guest	
2023	QPVN	Sắc màu Việt Nam qua ống kính Trần Tuấn Việt	10 July 2023	Guest	
2023	Nghe An Television	Trò chuyện cuối tuần: Trần Tuấn Việt – Người mang vẻ đẹp Việt Nam ra Thế giới	17 April 2023	Guest	
2024	VTV5	Chào tuần mới – Lao động sáng tạo, tái tạo con người	29 April 2024	Guest	
2024	VTV2	Cho ngày hoàn hảo – Nhiếp ảnh gia Trần Tuấn Việt	5 May 2024	Guest	
