= BTV3 =

BTV3 may refer to:

- BTV-3, a variant of the Bluetongue virus in ruminants
- A Vietnamese television channel; see List of television channels in Vietnam
