= VTV10 =

Vietnamese TV network

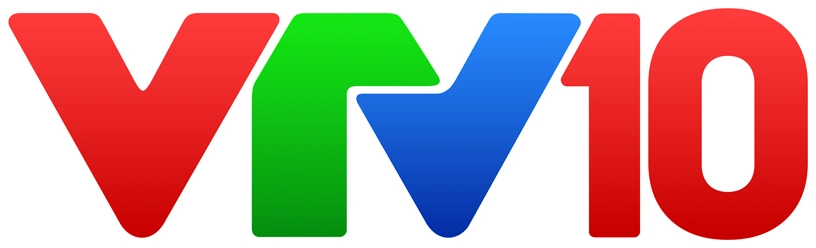
- Country: Vietnam
- Broadcast area: Cần Thơ; Mekong Delta
- Headquarters: VTV Center in Southern Region of Cần Thơ City, 407 April 30th Boulevard, Tân An Ward, Cần Thơ, Vietnam

Programming
- Language: Vietnamese
- Picture format: 1080p 16:9

Ownership
- Owner: Vietnam Television
- Sister channels: VTV1, VTV2, VTV3, VTV4, VTV5, VTV5 Tây Nam Bộ, VTV5 Tây Nguyên, VTV6, VTV7, VTV8, VTV9, VTV10, Vietnam Today

History
- Launched: 2 May 1975; 51 years ago (as a regional channel); 10 October 2022; 4 years ago (as a national channel)
- Replaced: VTV6
- Closed: 1 January 2016; 10 years ago (as a regional channel)
- Former names: CTV; CVTV; CVTV1; VTV Cần Thơ 1 VTV Cần Thơ

Links
- Website: vtv.vn

Availability

Terrestrial
- Thaicom-6: 4034 H 19200

Streaming media
- VTVgo: Watch live
- FPT Play: Watch live

VTV10 is the national television channel for the Southwest region of Vietnam Television, serving audiences in the Mekong Delta and Vietnamese audiences interested in this region. VTV10's programs span various genres: political commentary, science and education, sports, culture and entertainment, dramas, and advertising. In addition, VTV10 produces and collaborate with other units of Vietnam Television to broadcast live events in the Southwest region on VTV channels.

The predecessor of VTV10 was the regional television channel VTV Can Tho, formerly part of the regional channel system of Vietnam Television with two channels, VTV Can Tho 1 and VTV Can Tho 2, managed by the Vietnam Television Center in Can Tho City. From 1 January 2016, VTV Can Tho 1 ceased broadcasting and merged with the regional channel VTV9 to form the national television channel VTV9, targeting audiences throughout the Southern region. Meanwhile, VTV Can Tho 2 was transformed into VTV5 Southwest to serve the Khmer ethnic community in Vietnam.

On 8 September 2022, according to Decree No. 60/2022/ND-CP on restructuring affiliated units of Vietnam Television, the Vietnam Television Center in the Southern region was split to re-establish the Vietnam Television Center in Ho Chi Minh City and establish the Vietnam Television Center in the Southwest region. At 05:30 on 10 October 2022, VTV Can Tho was re-broadcast after 6 years of stopping broadcasting, replacing the previous VTV6.

Beginning at 00:00 on 30 March 2026, to improve the quality for audience services and reposition nation promotion channels, VTV Can Tho was renamed to VTV10.

== History ==
=== Regional Channel ===
The predecessor of VTV10 was Can Tho Television, established on December 3, 1966. It was the second television station in Vietnam after Saigon Television Station, established in 1965. Initially, Can Tho Television broadcast via an in-flight television system similar to Saigon Television Station, and officially began broadcasting on frequency band 7 on November 11, 1968.

After the reunification of Vietnam, Can Tho Television Station quickly began operations to promptly meet the audiovisual and cultural needs of the people of the Mekong Delta. The technical staff and engineers of Can Tho Television Station at that time began designing and converting the broadcasting system and central equipment from the FCC system left over from the Republic of Vietnam regime to the OIRT system. The 9th Military Region's Information Regiment provided electronic components to design mobile recording boats and mobile recording vehicles for the unit. Subsequently, the station's technical staff continued to design the conversion from the OIRT system to the SECAM III B color broadcasting system and then to the PAL-DK system, with the equipment gradually transitioning to the UMATIC and BETACAM broadcasting systems.

In 1980, Can Tho Television had two broadcasting channels: Channel 11 VHF and Channel 6 VHF.

In 1983–1984, Can Tho Television sent staff and engineers to help Cambodia establish its National Television, building a system from the central station to the broadcasting stations and undertaking the training of technical staff and reporters. In 1984, Can Tho Television also helped Da Nang Television transition from OIRT to SECAM III B broadcasting. During these years, radio and television stations in the Southwestern provinces also began to be established. Can Tho Television also undertook the task of sending technical staff to help local stations install central equipment and transmitters, and helped train reporters and editors, etc.

In 1992, Can Tho Television became a regional television station under Vietnam Television and broadcast on channel 6, with the initial logo being THCT, then CTV since 1997. At the end of 2003, Can Tho Television Station moved its headquarters to No. 215, 30/4 Street, Ninh Kieu District, Can Tho City. (Note: "VTV Can Tho - Aspiration of the Land of Nine Dragons". 2015. At that time, "VTV Can Tho – Aspiration of the Land of Nine Dragons" was a documentary film aired in 2015, marking a turning point in VTV Can Tho’s development as it renewed its content to better serve the diverse communities of the Mekong Delta. The film portra the aspirations for progress, integration, and cultural preservation of the people in Southern Vietnam, while highlighting VTV Can Tho’s role as a representative voice for the dynamic and evolving region known as the Land of Nine Dragons.) On 1 January 2004, Can Tho Television Station had a new name: Vietnam Television Center in Can Tho City, with the logo CVTV.

On 1 September 2004, CVTV2 channel was officially launched to serve the Khmer ethnic community living in the Southwest region, with a duration of 18 hours a day. This channel also broadcasts general programs like CVTV1, but devotes part of its time to broadcasting Khmer-language programs.

In 2010, VTV Can Tho changed the frequency and transmitter of CVTV1 channel from channel 6 VHF to channel 49 UHF.

On 5 June 2011, CVTV was rebranded to VTV Can Tho. CVTV1 and CVTV2 channels were also renamed VTV Can Tho and 2, respectively. By 2013, VTV Can Tho 1 channel had its broadcasting time increased to 24 hours a day.

On 1 January 2016, implementing the National Press Plan, the national television channel of the Southern region - VTV9 was formed on the basis of merging VTV Can Tho 1 channel with VTV9 region, while VTV Can Tho 2 was converted to VTV5 Southwest, serving the Khmer ethnic community in Vietnam.

=== National channel ===
On 8 September 2022, according to Decree No. 60/2022/ND-CP of the Government on restructuring VTV's affiliated units, the VTV Center in the Southern region was divided into the VTV Center in Ho Chi Minh City and the VTV Center in the Mekong Delta. In which, the VTV Center in the Southwest region is responsible for producing programs for VTV Can Tho channel and other VTV channels. On 6 October 2022, the Ministry of Information and Communications licensed Vietnam Television to produce a national television channel in the Mekong Delta called VTV Can Tho.

VTV Can Tho were test broadcasting from 05:30 on 10 October 2022, and then officially broadcast from 18:00 on 13 October 2022.

From 21 November – 18 December 2022, during the FIFA World Cup 2022, VTV Can Tho channel will temporarily increase its broadcasting time to 24/7.

The channel's general control is currently located at the headquarters of Vietnam Television in Hanoi; the Vietnam Television Center in the Southwest region in Can Tho is responsible for providing programs to the general control in Hanoi. The signal from here is transmitted widely throughout the provinces and cities in the Southwest region and is covered on many different television infrastructures to serve audiences nationwide.

=== VTV10 ===
Beginning on 00:00 on 30 March 2026, to improve the quality for audience services and reposition nation promotion channels, VTV Can Tho is officially renamed to VTV10. The channel's content will maintain its comprehensive focus for the entire Southwestern region, but will place a greater emphasis on programs related to agriculture and rural areas. By 1 April 2026, the Southern Region Vietnam Television Center will be re-established through the merger and restructuring of the Southwestern Region Vietnam Television Center and the Ho Chi Minh City Television Center.

== Leaders of VTV10 ==
- Manager: Vo Ngoc Van Quan.
- Deputy Director: Phan Phuoc Thien.

== Broadcast time ==
=== VTV10, 2026-present ===
- 30 March 2026 – present: 24/7

=== VTV Can Tho, 2022–2026 ===
- 10 October – 21 November 2022; 19 – 28 December 2022; 30 December 2022 – 13 July 2025: 05:30–23:30 daily.
- 21 November – 19 December 2022; 14 July 2025 – 30 March 2026: 24/7.
- Lunar New Year's Eve: 05:30–19:00.
- 29 December 2022: 05:30–24:00 same day.

=== CTV, 1994 - 2003 ===
- 1 June 1994 – 17 September 1998: 07:30–11:45, 14:15–16:30, 17:30–00:30 daily.
- 17 September 1998 – 1 January 2004: 06:00–12:00, 14:00–16:30, 17:30–23:30 daily.

=== CVTV/CVTV1/VTV Can Tho 1, 2004 - 2016 ===
- 1 January 2004 – 1 January 2012: 05:30–23:30 daily.
- 2012: 05:30–23:20 daily.
- 1 January 2013 – 1 January 2016: 24/7.

== See also ==
- Vietnam Television
