= ANTV (disambiguation) =

ANTV is an Indonesian television broadcaster.

ANTV may also refer to:

- Asamblea Nacional Televisión, a TV station and social media channel of the National Assembly of Venezuela
- People's Public Security Television, a specialized official TV channel in Vietnam

== See also ==
- Afghanistan National Television, part of the Radio Television Afghanistan (RTA) public broadcaster
