= VTV4 =

International television network in Vietnam

- Country: Vietnam
- Broadcast area: Vietnam; Worldwide (via internet)

Programming
- Language: Vietnamese
- Picture format: 1080i HDTV

Ownership
- Owner: Vietnam Television
- Sister channels: VTV1; VTV2; VTV3; VTV5; VTV5 Tây Nam Bộ; VTV5 Tây Nguyên; VTV6; VTV7; VTV8; VTV9; VTV10

History
- Launched: 1 January 1998; 28 years ago

Links
- Website: https://vtv4.vtv.vn

Availability

Terrestrial
- DVB-T2: UHF 25, 26, 27
- Thaicom 6: 4034 H 19200

VTV4 is the international community television channel of Vietnam Television, targeting Vietnamese audiences living abroad and foreigners interested in Vietnam. Launched on 7 January 1998, it offers the three domestic channels to the Vietnamese diaspora worldwide. Most of VTV4's programs are produced by the station's International Television Department and include news, dramas, music, documentaries, and entertainment for the Vietnamese community overseas. In addition, the channel also re-broadcasts some programs and segments from other VTV channels.

VTV4 is also available over-the-air in Vientiane, capital of the ideologically-aligned state of Laos.

From 31 March 2018, Vietnam Television stopped broadcasting the channel on foreign satellites.

== History ==
VTV4 began its trial broadcast on 1 January 1995, leasing one hour from 21:45 to 22:45 on a transponder on the Russian Gorizont 25 satellite.

On 1 January 1998, VTV4 officially began broadcasting under the name "Program for Vietnamese expatriates and friends around the world", covering all of Asia and Europe with a daily broadcast time of 2 hours from 12am-2am Vietnam time, The channel also switched to broadcasting via Measat 1 satellite, with the signal relayed via Thaicom 3 satellite. On 3 February 1998, the VTV4 Program Editorial Department, under the Editorial Secretariat, was established.

From 1 April 1998, along with the separation of VTV3 into a separate satellite channel, VTV4 increased its broadcast time from 00:00 to 04:00 AM. On 27 April 2000, VTV4 officially achieved worldwide coverage by relaying the VTV4 signal via the Telstar 5 satellite, covering the North American region. From 1 January 2002, the airtime doubled again to eight hours, and at the same time, it started delivering its coverage to the Hot Bird satellite to better serve Europe.

According to Decision n.º29 of Prime Minister Phan Văn Khải of 7 February 2002, VTV4's Editorial Programming Department was split from the Editorial Secretariate and became the Editorial Council for International Affairs. In 2004, the Editorial Council for International Affairs was renamed Television Council for International Affairs.

On 15 May 2005, VTV4 went broadcasting 24/7, maintaining the 00:00-08:00 block as it was but adding two repeats after that, forming an eight-hour wheel, to cater to a vast array of timezones. On 20 June 2009, the eight-hour wheel was discarded and a new 24/7 schedule was introduced.

From 22 June 2015, VTV4 started broadcast in high definition on VTVCab, and officially began promotional broadcasting two days later.

At 00:05 Hanoi Time on 31 March 2018, VTV halted all broadcasts of the channel on foreign satellites: Thaicom 5, Eutelsat Hot Bird 13B, Hispasat 30W-5, Galaxy 19.

With the launch of Vietnam Today on 7 September 2025, all foreign-language news broadcasts on VTV4 officially ceased and moved to the newly-launched channel, marking the end of many years of broadcasting foreign-language news programs on VTV4. Most foreign-language programs were transferred to Vietnam Today. Since then, VTV4 has only broadcast news in Vietnamese and dedicated more airtime to new Vietnamese-language programs, aiming to reflect and serve the Vietnamese community abroad.
