= VTV5 =

- Country: Vietnam
- Broadcast area: Vietnam

Programming
- Languages: VTV5: Vietnamese, Hmong, Tai Dam, Dao, Tày-Nùng, Mường, Sán Chay, Bru-Vân Kiều, Chinese VTV5 Southwest: Vietnamese, Khmer VTV5 Central Highlands: Vietnamese, Rade, Bahnar, Jarai, Mnong, Koho, Jeh-Tariang, Sedang, Chru, Roglai, Cham, Katu, Hrê, Stieng
- Picture format: 1080i HDTV

Ownership
- Owner: Vietnam Television
- Sister channels: VTV1, VTV2, VTV3, VTV4, VTV5, VTV5 Tây Nam Bộ, VTV5 Tây Nguyên, VTV6, VTV7, VTV8, VTV9, VTV10

History
- Launched: 2002; 24 years ago

Links
- Website: https://www.vtv.vn https://vtv5.vtv.vn https://vtv5.org.vn

Availability

Terrestrial
- DVB-T2: UHF 25, 26, 27
- Satellite: Vinasat 1, Vinasat 2, Thaicom 6

VTV5 is a television channel for ethnic minorities of Vietnam Television, tasked with transmitting information and policies of the Party and State to ethnic minority communities. The channel's main content includes news programs, programs in ethnic minority languages with Vietnamese subtitles, and cultural, educational, and entertainment programs produced under the direction of the Center for Ethnic and Rural Communication.
