= VTV6 =

Vietnam Television sports channel

- Country: Vietnam
- Broadcast area: Vietnam

Programming
- Language: Vietnamese
- Picture format: 1080i HDTV

Ownership
- Owner: Vietnam Television
- Sister channels: VTV1, VTV2, VTV3, VTV4, VTV5, VTV5 Tây Nam Bộ, VTV5 Tây Nguyên, VTV7, VTV8, VTV9, VTV10, Vietnam Today

History
- Launched: 29 April 2007; 19 years ago (as a youth channel); 8 June 2026; 5 months ago (as a sport channel)
- Closed: 10 October 2022; 4 years ago (as a youth channel)
- Replaced by: VTV Cần Thơ/VTV10 (2022)

Links
- Website: https://vtv.vn

VTV6 is a specialized sports television channel of Vietnam Television, which officially launched on 8 June 2026. The channel's main content includes news bulletins, features, and programs reporting on domestic and international sports, sports documentaries, training programs, dietary and lifestyle guides, and health care advice; sports training programs and introductions to competition rules on television; specialized programs on physical education, sports medicine; game shows and television programs with sports themes; and foreign sports programs, etc. with content primarily produced by the Sports Television Center. Aiming to promote the development of mass sports, school sports, and professional sports in Vietnam, as well as to improve community health and build well-rounded individuals.

Originally, VTV6 was launched on 29 April 2007 as an entertainment channel for the younger demographics. Although VTV6 in this era was operated by Youth Department, several programs produced by Department of Sports Programs Production (present-day Sports Television Center) were mostly broadcast on this channel since 2015, so it was also known as a VTV channel for live broadcast of sports events, especially Vietnamese sports events or major sports events. The original VTV6 officially ceased to broadcast on 10 October 2022, making place for a national channel aimed at Mekong Delta Region audiences - VTV Can Tho (present-day VTV10).

== History ==
=== 2007–2022: Youth channel era ===
VTV6 was originally mentioned for the first time in the development plan of Vietnam Television in the period 2006 - 2010 with the original orientation to be a specialized channel for sports (Teenage content was then geared towards VTV7) to replace VTV3 at a time when VTV3 began to increase its acquisition of broadcasting rights for entertainment programs and dedicated most of its prime time slot and weekends to broadcasting these programs to generate profit for the station.

On the evening of 28 April 2007, VTV6 officially launched with a live broadcast event titled VTV6 – A New Friend (Người bạn mới) on VTV3, introducing the upcoming television channel for young people. The channel officially began broadcasting on 29 April, marking the first time Vietnam had a television channel dedicated solely to teenagers. In 2008, VTV6 Youth Center was officially renamed as VTV6 Youth Department.

In the early days, the channel's coverage was very limited. The channel was tested on VCTV10 (present-day On Cine – VTVcab 10) and then broadcast in analog on broadcast channel. It was not until 29 April 2009, that the channel was broadcast in the South, then officially broadcast nationwide on 7 September 2010. At the same time, VTV6 also improved the quality of content and increase the broadcast time from 12 hours to 18 hours per day from 1 November 2010.

In 2009, to celebrate the channel's second anniversary, VTV6 launched the slogan "Dreams don't wait" ("Ước mơ không chờ đợi") through a nationwide slogan writing contest.

On 27 December 2010, the Youth and Children's Department's live broadcast of the 8th National Emulation Congress on VTV1 marked VTV6's entry as one of the units producing programs about important political and historical events of the country on VTV's channels.

From 1 May 2012, VTV6 began implementing changes in both program content and presentation style to target a diverse audience, focusing on viewers aged 20 to 29. The channel's visual identity was revamped, removing the spiral number 6 symbol and replacing it with a blue geometric number 6 logo to align with other VTV channels. Alongside this, VTV6 invested in a range of new content, including the first-ever broadcast of original versions of popular international television programs such as American Idol and MasterChef, and the revival of Những bông hoa nhỏ ("Little Flowers") as a series of programs for children of different ages.

From 1 January 2013, the channel increased broadcasting time to 24/7, became the sixth channel of VTV to broadcast 24 hours per day.

From 7 September 2013, VTV6 became the second channel of VTV to be broadcast in HD, and the first channel of VTV to broadcast in Full HD.

Since October 2015, most sports programs previously broadcast on VTV3 have been moved to VTV6, which has since been frequently chosen as the main channel for live coverage of sporting events for which VTV holds broadcasting rights, especially tournaments involving the Vietnamese national teams and sports delegation.

On 12 January 2018, VTV6 separated the Children's Board from the Youth Department. VTV6 officially entered a new movement called "The Digital Generation 2018", deciding to aiming at the "digital generation" born between the year of 1985 and 2000. Since that time, television programs for children on VTV6 were officially transferred to the educational channel VTV7.

From 19 March to 30 April 2020, VTV6 temporarily reduced its broadcast time to 19 hours per day (05:00–24:00) due to COVID-19 prevention and control requirements. From 1 May 2020, the broadcasting hours have been reverted to 24 hours a day.

On 8 September 2022, Deputy Prime Minister Phạm Bình Minh signed Decree No. 60/2022/ND-CP on the functions, tasks, powers and organizational structure of Vietnam Television. Accordingly, VTV has been restructured, in which the Youth Department - the management board of VTV6 - will be dissolved. As a result, VTV6 would officially cease to broadcast as a youth channel on 10 October 2022 and is replaced by for a national channel aimed at Mekong Delta Region audiences - VTV Can Tho.

=== 2026–present: Sport channel era ===
In a sport program called Giờ vàng thể thao (Sports Prime Time) broadcast on 29 May 2026, VTV6 was announced to be relaunched as a sport channel, with the launching event taken place on 8 June 2026 and would go live on VTV1.

On 2 June 2026, Ministry of Culture, Sports and Tourism granted VTV a license to produce the national sports channel VTV6. This marks the return of the channel for the first time after almost 3 years and 8 months. This is the second channel of VTV network to be revived after VTV Cần Thơ (present-day VTV10) and also the first full-time sport-dedicated channel of VTV Network.

The formation of the VTV6 sports channel resulted from a cooperation agreement in late May 2026 between VTV's Sports Television Center and the Vietnam Department of Physical Education and Sports, the Vietnam Olympic Committee, and more than 30 sports federations and associations in Vietnam. The parties committed to promoting the image of Vietnamese national teams, athletes, and coaches, as well as coordinating information and propaganda on state policies and guidelines regarding physical education and sports. The launching ceremony was held on 8 June 2026 in Hanoi, and the channel officially went on air at 09:40 the same day. Sports programs that broadcast on other VTV channels are gradually being transferred to this channel, with the exception of some live sporting events airing at the same time, which will be broadcast on VTV7 as an overflow channel. Beginning on 21 July 2026, after the 2026 FIFA World Cup concludes, VTV6 resume schedule broadcasting after more than 43 days since the channel first went on air.

== Programming ==
=== Youth channel era ===
- Bữa trưa vui vẻ
- Cuộc đua không dừng lại
- Ghế không tựa
- Hôm nay ai đến?

=== Sport channel era ===
- VTV Sports News
- Cận cảnh thể thao
- Giờ vàng thể thao
- 360° thể thao
- Nhịp đập thể thao

=== Sporting events ===
- 2026 FIFA World Cup
- 2026 ASEAN Hyundai Cup
- 2026–27 V.League 1
- 2026–27 J1 League
- 2026–27 AFC Champions League Elite and AFC Champions League Two (sub-licensed from TV360)
- 2026 Asian Games
- Several domestic tournaments

== Logos ==
2013–2022

June–September 2026
