= VTV3 =

Vietnamese TV channel

- Country: Vietnam

Programming
- Language: Vietnamese
- Picture format: 1080i HDTV

Ownership
- Owner: Vietnam Television
- Sister channels: VTV1, VTV2, VTV3, VTV4, VTV5 Tây Nam Bộ, VTV5 Tây Nguyên, VTV6, VTV7, VTV8, VTV9, VTV10

History
- Launched: 31 March 1996; 30 years ago

Availability

Terrestrial
- Digital: UHF 25, 26, 27

Streaming media
- VTVgo: Watch live

VTV3 is a general sports, culture, and entertainment television channel of Vietnam Television. As the country's first ever sports and entertainment dedicated channel, it broadcasts sporting events and entertainment-oriented programs including music, game shows, leisure & lifestyles, nationally produced, as well as American and Asian series. The channel's content is contributed by some departments and units of Vietnam Television, with the Culture and Entertainment Department being the main production unit.

== History ==
- From April 1995, the channel broadcast on channel 6 in Hanoi with the content Sports - Culture – Entertainment – Economic Information. That same year, the channel aired its first US series, Charlie's Angels. TV series from Western countries were, at the time, negotiated by Alicom Ltd., a French company.
- At 10:00 a.m., 31 March 1996, on channel 6 in Hanoi and surrounding areas, VTV3 officially launched as a Sports – Entertainment – Economic Information channel. It is also relayed nationwide via satellite in July of the same year. Since the launch of the channel, VTV began to broadcast the Premier League, made this channel becomes the first ever channel to broadcast the tournament in Vietnam, starting from the 1996–97 season.

== See also ==
- HTV7
