= VTV2 =

Vietnamese television channel

- Country: Vietnam
- Broadcast area: Vietnam; Asia; Worldwide

Programming
- Language: Vietnamese
- Picture format: 1080i HDTV

Ownership
- Owner: Vietnam Television
- Sister channels: VTV1; VTV2; VTV3; VTV4; VTV5; VTV5 Tây Nam Bộ; VTV5 Tây Nguyên; VTV6; VTV7; VTV8; VTV9; VTV10

History
- Launched: 1 January 1990; 36 years ago

Links
- Website: http://www.vtv.vn/

Availability

Terrestrial
- VHF (Hanoi, Vietnam): VHF 11
- Digital: UHF 25, 26, 27

VTV2 is a science, technology, and education television channel of Vietnam Television (VTV), Launched on 1 January 1990, it features meticulously produced news and thematic programs aimed at improving people's lives and disseminating cultural, scientific, and technological knowledge. Programs on the channel are overseen by VTV's Science and Education Department, targeting diverse audiences with varied formats. In 1993, Vietnam Television signed an accord with Canal France Television of France Télévisions to broadcast selected programs of the latter channel. This channel plays a crucial role in science communication in Vietnam.

As of 2026, the channel airs 24 hours a day. VTV2 HD, an HD simulcast of the channel, was launched on 19 May 2015.

After VTV6 stopped broadcasting, VTV2 broadcast some V-League matches live. Starting from 2023 season, VTV2 will take the VTV6's role to broadcast V-league matches live.

== Programming ==
=== Current programming ===
- Motion News 24h
- World Discovery
- Films:
  - Vietnamese LAB
  - Foreign LAB
- Change Life
- Family Time
- Discover Journey
- Happiness for Everyhome
- Go! VTV
- 4 Season Love
- Beauty 24/7
- Healthy for Everybody
- Vietnam Discovery
- Transport Light
- News For Hearing Disabilities
- Technology Life
- The Amazing Bus
- Eurovision Song Contest Asia
- Pokémon Horizons: The Series
- Robocon Vietnam
- S-Tech

=== Former programming ===
==== Disney Club series ====
- Aladdin (animated TV series)
- Jake and the Never Land Pirates
- Sofia the First

==== Anime series ====
- Pokémon: XY
- Pokémon: XY: Kalos Quest
- Yo-kai Watch

==== Drama series ====
- How I Met Your Mother
- Sex and the City
