= VTV1 =

Vietnamese television network

- Country: Vietnam
- Broadcast area: Vietnam; Worldwide (via internet)

Programming
- Picture format: 1080i HDTV

Ownership
- Owner: Vietnam Television
- Sister channels: VTV2; VTV3; VTV4; VTV5; VTV5 Tây Nam Bộ; VTV5 Tây Nguyên; VTV6; VTV7; VTV8; VTV9; VTV10

History
- Launched: 7 September 1970; 56 years ago
- Former names: Vietnam Television; Central Television - Programme 1 Vietnam Television - Programme 1

Links
- Website: http://www.vtv.vn/

Availability

Terrestrial
- Digital: Channel 35
- Thaicom 6 (satellite): 4034 H 19200

Streaming media
- VTVgo: Watch live
- VTV.vn: Watch live
- FPT Play: Watch live

VTV1 is a news, commentary, and general affairs television channel by Vietnam Television (VTV). It is the oldest channel operated by VTV. The channel focuses on news and commentary programs produced by the station's News Department, with news bulletins and features aimed at delivering up-to-date information to viewers, while also playing a leading role in the propaganda and public opinion shaping efforts of the Communist Party of Vietnam and the Government of Vietnam. VTV1 also dedicates a portion of its airtime to broadcasting other general affairs programs of VTV.

VTV1 is seen as one of the "essential television channels" in Vietnam, legally required to be carried by all television providers in the country.

== History ==
Vietnam Television started broadcasting on September 7, 1970, with technical support from Cuba. In late July 1992, the channel started broadcasting an English-language news service catering foreigners in the country. Its breakfast program, Chào buổi sáng, was launched on March 31, 1997.

== Broadcast hours ==
- From 7 September 1970 to 2 January 1983
  - Morning: 06:30 to 13:00.
  - Evening: 16:00 to 22:30.
- Before 4 February 1990
  - Monday to Saturday:
    - Morning: 07:00 to 10:30
    - Afternoon: 12:00 to 15:00
    - Evening: 16:00 to 22:00
  - Sunday:
    - Morning: 05:30 to 09:30
    - Afternoon: 11:30 to 14:30
    - Evening: 16:30 to 22:00
- From 4 February 1990 - 1 February 1993
    - Morning: 08:00 to 11:00
    - Afternoon: 13:00 to 15:00
    - Evening: 18:00 to 23:00
- From 1 February 1993 - 1 April 1994
    - Morning: 09:00 to 12:00
    - Afternoon: 14:00 to 16:00
    - Evening: 19:00 to 23:00
- From 1 April 1994 - 31 March 1996
  - Monday to Saturday:
    - Morning: 09:00 to 11:00.
    - Evening: 18:45 to 22:45.
  - Sunday:
    - Morning: 06:00 to 10:00.
    - Evening: 18:45 to 22:45.
- Before 31 March 1996:
  - Monday to Saturday:
    - Morning: 06:00 to 09:00.
    - Evening: 17:30 to 23:00.
  - Sunday:
    - Morning: 06:00 to 10:00.
    - Evening: 17:30 to 23:00.
- From 31 March 1996 to 31 March 1997: 11:00 to 23:00.
- From 31 March 1997 to 31 March 1998:
  - Morning: 06:00 to 8:00.
  - Evening: 17:00 to 23:00.
- From 31 March 1998 to 1 January 2002:
  - Morning: 05:30 to 12:00.
  - Evening: 16:00 to 24:00.
- From 1 January 2002 to 1 September 2010: 05:30 to 02:00.
- From 1 September 2010 to 15 June 2011: 05:00 to 02:00.
- From 15 June 2011 to present: 24/7.
