= Vietnam Television =

National television broadcaster of Vietnam

- Logo of Vietnam Television since 2026
- Type: State media
- Branding: VTV
- Country: Vietnam
- First air date: 7 September 1970; 56 years ago
- Availability: Worldwide, primarily in Vietnam
- Motto: Đồng hành cùng khán giả ("Accompanying the audience")
- Headquarters: 43 Nguyen Chi Thanh Road, Giang Vo Ward, Hanoi
- Nation: Vietnam
- Owner: Central Committee of the Communist Party of Vietnam
- Launch date: 1973
- Former names: Independent Television System; Central Television
- Picture format: 1080i
- Webcast: vtvgo.vn
- Official website: vtv.vn vtv.org.vn
- Language: Vietnamese, English, French, Russian, Chinese, Japanese
- Subsidiary: VTV Digital; VFC; VTV Sports; VTVADD; VTV College; VTVcab; SCTV; VSTV

Vietnam Television, also known as VTV, is the state broadcaster of Vietnam, operating under the auspices of the Central Committee of the Communist Party of Vietnam and managed by the Ministry of Culture, Sports and Tourism. Its stated goals are "propagating the Party's guidelines, the State's and National Assembly's policies and laws, contributing to education, raising public awareness, and serving the people's spiritual life." Although not the first television station in Vietnam, it is considered the largest, with 13 broadcast channels and a nationwide pay-TV system, primarily airing news, documentaries, science, social education, comedy, sports, entertainment, and drama.

VTV was established with technical assistance and training from Cuba on 7 September 1970. Color television was experimented in 1977 and the French SECAM standard was fully implemented in 1986. Vietnam Television became an official name on 30 April 1987, and by 1990, VTV viewers had two national TV channels to choose from, as VTV2 was launched and that year switched to PAL.

On 7 September 2026, for its 56th anniversary, VTV adopted a new branding system across its channels.

== Channels ==
VTV headquarters in Hanoi, pictured in 2024

As of 2026, VTV operates the following channels:

- VTV1: News and current affairs channel; broadcasts 24/7. The channel also broadcasts live national events and National Assembly meetings. Music and film are the only fields that mostly fall outside its main format. VTV1 was first broadcast on 7 September 1970. An HD version of VTV1 was launched on 31 March 2014. It is one of the three must-carry national channels, and it must be carried free-to-air by all satellite and cable providers in Vietnam.
- VTV2: Science and education channel; broadcasting 24/7. The channel also broadcasts foreign TV series. VTV2 started transmission on 1 January 1990. An HD version of VTV2 was launched on 20 May 2015.
- VTV3: Sports and entertainment channel, broadcasting 24/7. VTV3 officially launched on 31 March 1996. An HD version of VTV3 was launched on 31 March 2013. This is the first VTV channel to broadcast in high-definition.
- VTV4: An international channel officially launched in 1998, offering a best-of package of programming from VTV's domestic channels to the Vietnamese diaspora, being available in Taiwan's CHT MOD on Channel 215. An HD version of VTV4 was launched on 24 June 2015.
- VTV5: Ethnic language channel, broadcast 24/7. VTV5 launched on 10 February 2002. An HD version of VTV5 was launched on 1 July 2015.
  - VTV5 Tây Nam Bộ: A bilingual Khmer-Vietnamese channel and first regional variation of VTV5, broadcast 24/7. Launched on 1 January 2016.
  - VTV5 Tây Nguyên: Ethnic language channel in Central Highlands region of Vietnam and second regional variation of VTV5, broadcast 24/7. Launched on 17 October 2016.
- VTV6: Sports channel, broadcasting 24/7. Originally youth channel; relaunched as a sports channel on 8 June 2026.
- VTV7: Educational and children-orientated channel, broadcast from 06:00 to 24:00. VTV7 and VTV7 HD soft-launched from 20 November 2015 and began broadcasting officially on 1 January 2016.
- VTV8: Specialized channel focusing on culture, history, heritage, and tourism, broadcast 24/7. VTV8 was launched on 1 January 2016.
- VTV9: Specialized channel for viewers in the Southeast region of Vietnam, before it launched as national channel, its release as regional channel on 8 October 2007. An HD version of VTV9 was launched on 28 August 2015. On 1 January 2016, VTV Can Tho 1 and VTV9 merged to VTV9 as national channel.
- VTV10: Specialized channel for viewers in the Southwest region of Vietnam, broadcast 24/7. It was soft-launched on 10 October 2022 after the closure of the original VTV6 and began broadcasting officially from 13 October 2022 as VTV Can Tho. On 30 March 2026, VTV Cần Thơ was rebranded as VTV10.
- Vietnam Today: English-language international channel, broadcast 24/7. Launched on 7 September 2025.

All channels are available digitally via terrestrial, cable and satellite networks across Vietnam. Through its cable television subsidiary VTVcab and its participation in joint ventures SCTV and K+, VTV also partakes in the Vietnamese pay television market.

=== Defunct channels ===
- VTV6: Originally a youth channel that targets an audience between 18 and 34 years old and also broadcasting sporting events, broadcast 24/7. VTV6 started broadcasting on 29 April 2007. An HD version of VTV6 was launched on 7 September 2013.
- VTV Huế
- VTV Đà Nẵng
- VTV Phú Yên
- VTV Cần Thơ 1
- VTV Cần Thơ 2

== Criticism and controversies ==
VTV4 has been criticized by refugees and emigrants from the former South Vietnam, due to the network supporting communist rule.

On 28 February 2016, VTV admitted that they had used copyrighted content without permission in some of its programs. Thus, VTV's YouTube channel was terminated. The case was brought into attention after videographer Bui Minh Tuan claimed that VTV had repeatedly used his drone videos. He claimed that between 2015 and 2016, he had sent many complaints to VTV, the Department of Copyright and the Vietnam Ministry of Information and Communications to report around 20 copyright infringements by VTV, to no avail. Tuan decided to report the case to Google. In 2008, VTV lost its rights to broadcast the Miss World competition due to copyright issues.

== Awards ==
=== Asiavision ===
Year	Award ceremony	Category	Nominee / Work	Result	Ref.
2020	Asiavision Annual Awards	Outstanding Reporting on Climate Change and Adaptation	VTV	Won	
2020	Asiavision Annual Awards	Outstanding Reporting of a News Story	VTV	Won	
2021	Asiavision Annual Awards	Coverage of the Year	VTV	Won	
2025	Asiavision Awards	Best Disaster Coverage	VTV	Won	

=== National ===
- First-class Labor Order
- Second Ho Chi Minh Medal

== See also ==
- List of dramas broadcast by Vietnam Television
