= Vietnam Today =

- Country: Vietnam; Middle East
- Broadcast area: Vietnam; Worldwide (via internet)
- Headquarters: 43 Nguyen Chi Thanh street, Giang Vo, Hanoi, Vietnam

Programming
- Languages: English (mainly); Japanese, Chinese, French, and Russian; Vietnamese
- Picture format: 1080i HDTV

Ownership
- Owner: Central Committee of the Communist Party of Vietnam
- Parent: Vietnam Television

History
- Launched: August 19, 2025; 14 months ago (test broadcasting); September 7, 2025; 13 months ago (official launch)

Links
- Website: vietnamtoday.vtv.vn

Availability

Terrestrial
- Digital: UHF 24, 25
- Thaicom 6: 4034 H 19200
- Cignal TV: Channel 177
- SkyTV: Channel 184
- TrueVisions: Channel 783

Streaming media
- VTVgo: Watch live
- Vietnam Today: Watch live

Vietnam Today is an English-language Vietnamese television channel operated by the state-owned national broadcaster, Vietnam Television. Launched on September 7, 2025, it aims to provide a "comprehensive and contemporary view of the country for a global audience", covering a broad spectrum of topics from politics and business to culture and tourism.

The channel was established under a prime ministerial decision as an instrument of Vietnam's communication and public diplomacy efforts. Its objective is to "promote the image of a modern, dynamic, and globally integrated Vietnam, challenge outdated international perceptions, and communicate the official guidelines of the Communist Party of Vietnam and the policies of the state to the world".

== History ==
=== Background ===
The legal framework for Vietnam Today was established by Decision No.747/QD-TTg, as issued by the Prime Minister of Vietnam on April 11, 2025. This directive mandated the creation of a national external television service with the mission to "promote Vietnam to the world". The channel was tasked with serving as a primary vehicle for the state's external information work, including the communication of the guidelines of the Communist Party of Vietnam and the policies and laws of the State to an international audience. Vietnam Today is thus a strategic state project rather than a market-driven media enterprise, which positions it as an official instrument of the Vietnamese government.

=== Announcements ===
On August 22, 2025, Vietnam Television held a ceremony in Hanoi to announce the launch of the channel. At this event, VTV's Deputy General Director, Đỗ Đức Hoàng, served as the spokesperson, articulating the channel's vision and strategic imperatives. He framed the project as an "urgent task" in a complex global environment, stating that the channel would aim to portray Vietnam "in an accurate, comprehensive, timely, and profound manner". Hoàng introduced the channel's core operational philosophy, which he defined by the guiding principles of "reliable information, engaging content, creative media".

=== Launch ===
Vietnam Today commenced its broadcast at 07:09 on September 7, 2025 (Indochina Time). The launch was timed to coincide with two major national milestones: the 80th anniversary of Vietnam's National Day and the 55th anniversary of VTV's first-ever broadcast. The launch ceremony was a high-profile state function held at the Hanoi Opera House, attended by senior government and party officials. Party General Secretary Tô Lâm presided over the event, where he presented VTV with the First-class Labour Order and delivered a keynote address. In his speech, he highlighted the channel's strategic importance in the national agenda, reinforcing its role as a key component of Vietnam's modern communication infrastructure. The remarkably short four-month period between the Prime Minister's decision in April and the official launch in September suggests the project was a high-level political priority, enabling the rapid mobilization of state resources to overcome typical bureaucratic and logistical delays.

== Objectives ==
The channel is explicitly conceived as an instrument of "digital diplomacy" and a tool for projecting Vietnam's soft power on the global stage. Its creation is a direct implementation of national policies aimed at leveraging culture and communication for foreign policy goals, such as the "Strategy for Cultural Diplomacy to 2030". Officials have described its purpose as creating a "bridge between Vietnam and the global community" and affirming the country's international prestige. This was further emphasized by Party General Secretary Tô Lâm at the launch event, where he tasked VTV and Vietnam Today with being a "pioneer on the ideological and cultural front" and helping to "elevate Vietnam's presence on the global media map".

A fundamental objective of Vietnam Today is to actively reshape global perceptions of the country by moving beyond what officials have termed "outdated stereotypes" and simplistic "pretty pictures and travel clips". The channel's mandate is to present a "vivid, contemporary and objective view" of modern Vietnam. The narrative it aims to construct is that of a "peaceful, forward-looking and stable nation" that harmoniously preserves its rich traditions while embracing innovation, economic development, and deep global integration. This official narrative also highlights the character of the Vietnamese people as youthful, resilient, and dynamic, positioning the nation as a proactive and welcoming member of the international community. While the channel's mission statement frequently employs terms like "objective" and "reliable," this is framed within the state's subjective goal of promoting a specific, curated national image. This suggests that "objectivity," in this context, refers to the authoritative presentation of the government's official perspective as the definitive, factual narrative, a common approach for state-run public diplomacy media.

Vietnam Today's establishment marks a significant strategic pivot in Vietnam's approach to international broadcasting. While its Vietnamese-language counterpart and semi-predecessor, VTV4, primarily served the Vietnamese diaspora with a package of domestic programming, Vietnam Today is designed to engage a much broader and more diverse international audience. This shift from an inward-facing service for expatriates to an outward-facing platform for global influence mirrors the model of other major state-backed international broadcasters. The channel has identified several key target demographics for its content:

- Policymakers and political leaders seeking reliable and official information on Vietnam's positions and development.
- Investors and the international business community looking for insights into economic opportunities and the investment climate.
- Scholars, experts, and researchers requiring access to data and in-depth analysis on Vietnamese affairs.
- Tourists and potential visitors interested in the country's culture, heritage, and destinations.
- The Vietnamese diaspora seeking to maintain a connection with their homeland.

== Programming ==
=== Content style ===
Vietnam Today's content is guided by three core principles, articulated by its leadership as "Official information, sharp content and creative communication" or, alternately, "reliable information, engaging content, creative media". This philosophy aims to balance the channel's role as a state broadcaster with the need to produce content that can compete in the global media market.

Programming is intended to carry a "distinctly Vietnamese identity" while being presented in a "modern, accessible style for global viewers". The overarching goal is to narrate Vietnam's story in a "vivid, new, attractive way, with a multi-dimensional perspective" that appeals to international tastes. The content spans a wide array of subjects, including politics, the economy, culture, society, tourism, cuisine, heritage, environmental issues, technological innovation, and digital transformation.

=== Programs ===
To cover this broad mandate, Vietnam Today has developed a slate of specialized programs. The programming is heavily weighted toward "soft" topics such as culture, tourism, and cuisine, which are central to nation-branding and soft power projection. Of the identified programs, a significant majority focus on these appealing, non-political aspects of the country. This content mix directly supports the channel's mission to reshape perceptions by building goodwill and attracting tourists and investors. At the same time, the inclusion of programs focused on political and economic discourse, such as The Point and Executive Talk, indicates an ambition to establish the channel as a credible source for its target audience of policymakers and business leaders. These programs serve as the primary vehicles for communicating official state and party positions on key issues.

The following table outlines the key known programs broadcast on the channel:

Key Programs on Vietnam Today
Genre	Program Title	Description
Current Affairs & Politics	Newsline	Up-to-the-minute news update in Vietnam and the world. Broadcasts hourly.
Current Affairs & Politics	Vietnam 360	Covers current affairs and political topics.
Current Affairs & Politics	The Point	Focuses on politics and in-depth commentary.
Current Affairs & Politics	Executive Talk	Features interviews with key figures.
Current Affairs & Politics	Inside Asia	Covers noteworthy news stories around Asia.
Current Affairs & Politics	Global Insight	Analyses the most important world event of the week.
Business & Economy	Daily Biz	Provides daily business and economic news.
Business & Economy	Bizline	Analyses the most important business topic of the week.
Business & Economy	Vietnam Innovators	A talk show with business executives, discussing future strategies for doing business.
Business & Economy	Local Towards Global	Features local productions & producers in the road of entering global markets.
Culture & Lifestyle	Culture Mosaic	Explores various aspects of Vietnamese culture.
Culture & Lifestyle	Amazing Vietnam	Showcases tourism and travel destinations.
Culture & Lifestyle	Heritage Journey	Focuses on Vietnam's cultural and natural heritage sites.
Culture & Lifestyle	Street Food	Explores Vietnam's vibrant street food scene.
Culture & Lifestyle	Fine Cusine	Introduces Vietnamese food and culinary.
Culture & Lifestyle	Taste of Vietnam	Delves into Vietnamese cuisine.
Culture & Lifestyle	Speak Like a Local	Teaches Vietnamese language phrases and Vietnamese culture for foreigners and Vietnamese diaspora.
Culture & Lifestyle	Eyes on V	A talk show shares the perspective of foreigners living in Vietnam on Vietnamese life.
Culture & Lifestyle	Vietnam Imprints	Stories of Vietnamese diaspora community contributing to the life of their nation and Vietnamese community.
Culture & Lifestyle	Vietnam Explained	Insight into Vietnamese life trends.
Culture & Lifestyle	Vibes of Vietnam	Explores the culture and the life in Vietnam.
Culture & Lifestyle	Health Matters	Dives into health issues.
Music & Entertainment	Tunebox	A program centered on music.
Music & Entertainment	Showtime	Culture feature show, featuring Vietnamese artists in various aspect of culture life.
Science & Technology	Tech Horizon	Covers innovation and technological developments.
Nature & Environment	Echoes of the Wild	Focuses on wildlife and environmental topics.

Besides English, Vietnam Today also offers monthly roundup of national news & culture insights via monthly foreign language news magazines, targeting audiences having Chinese, French, Japanese or Russian as their native language. The monthly foreign language news magazine is provided with English subtitles for English-speaking viewers.

Weekly News Magazine in Foreign Languages (with English subtitles)
Original name	Literal meaning	Language	English name
今日越南	Vietnam Today	Chinese	China Link
LES ECHOS du VIETNAM	The Echoes of Vietnam	French	France Link
ジャパンリンク	Japan Link	Japanese	Japan Link
ВОКРУГ ВЬЕТНАМА	Around Vietnam	Russian	Russia Link

== Personnel ==
Đỗ Đức Hoàng is the Deputy General Director of Vietnam Television and the executive associated with Vietnam Today.

Information regarding the channel's team of anchors, hosts, and correspondents is limited in official launch materials. Public announcements have made general references to a team of "young presenters" tasked with conveying the channel's modern image.

== Distribution ==
The channel's distribution network is designed to be robust both domestically and internationally. A key element of its initial international rollout is the leveraging of existing Vietnamese state-affiliated corporate infrastructure in neighboring countries. The specified OTT partners for Laos, Cambodia, and Myanmar—Unitel, Metfone, and Mytel, respectively—are all telecom brands operated by Viettel, a Vietnamese state-owned enterprise. This demonstrates a synergistic approach, using established commercial networks to deploy strategic media assets in a region of high geopolitical importance. Furthermore, the strong emphasis on OTT applications and social media platforms reflects an understanding of modern media consumption habits and a strategic effort to reach younger, digitally-native audiences worldwide.

The following table details the primary platforms where Vietnam Today is available:

Distribution platforms for Vietnam Today
Region	Platform Type	Provider / Service
Domestic	Digital Terrestrial (DTT)	VTV's national DTT network
Domestic	Cable television	VTVcab, SCTV
Domestic	Direct-to-Home (DTH) Satellite	DTH digital satellite system
Domestic	OTT	Vietnam Today App, VTVgo, VTVprime, VieON, SCTV Online, FPT Play, TV360, MyTV
International	Digital Terrestrial (DTT)	DTT network in Laos
International	OTT	Vietnam Today App, VTVgo; Toober; Unitel; Metfone; Mytel Singtel TV / CAST (by Singtel, Singapore) Channelbox (UK) JioTV (India) MENAFlix (Middle East) OSNTV (Saudi Arabia)
International	Social media	YouTube, Facebook, Instagram, TikTok

The channel's initial international broadcast footprint covers the Americas, Europe, and key Southeast Asian neighbors, including Laos, Cambodia, and Myanmar. VTV has announced plans for a phased expansion of its global distribution network beginning in 2026. This expansion will involve forging partnerships with international television service providers in regions identified as strategically important to Vietnam's foreign policy objectives. Future distribution methods will be tailored to the technological landscape of each target region and may include traditional terrestrial and satellite broadcasting, cable and IPTV services, and program exchange agreements with other broadcasters.
