= VTV9 =

Vietnamese TV network for the Southeast region

- Country: Vietnam
- Broadcast area: Ho Chi Minh City metropolitan area South East Vietnam; Mekong Delta; Nha Trang
- Headquarters: Current headquarters: Vietnam Television Center in Southeast Region of Ho Chi Minh City, 7B Nguyen Thi Minh Khai Street, Ben Nghe Ward, District 1, Ho Chi Minh City, Vietnam

Programming
- Language: Vietnamese
- Picture format: 1080p 16:9

Ownership
- Owner: Vietnam Television

History
- Launched: 8 October 2007; 19 years ago 1 January 2016; 10 years ago
- Replaced: VTV Can Tho 1
- Closed: 31 December 2015; 10 years ago
- Former names: VTV9

Links
- Website: vtv.vn

Availability

Terrestrial
- Thaicom-6: 4034 H 19200

Streaming media
- vtv.vn: Watch live
- FPT Play: Watch live

VTV9 is the national television channel for the Southeast region of Vietnam Television. The channel broadcasts 24/7 and offers rich content including news, sports, and entertainment programs, all tailored to the tastes and preferences of viewers from that region. Additionally, VTV9 produces many live broadcasts of major national events in the Southeast region for live transmission on VTV's television channels.

VTV9 is broadcast free of charge on the Vinasat-1 satellite, via analog terrestrial television infrastructure in the Southeast region, digital terrestrial television in areas where VTV provides digital terrestrial coverage, and online television infrastructure. On other pay TV services, VTV9 is broadcast with a locked code.

Before 2016, VTV9 played the role of VTV's regional television channel, broadcasting since 2007 to audiences in the Ho Chi Minh City area, the Southeast region and the North of Hau River. On January 1, 2016, per the National Press Planning Project, VTV9 channel was merged with VTV Can Tho 1 channel to form the national television channel VTV9, targeting audiences throughout the Southern region.

The total control of the channel is currently located at the Vietnam Television Center in Ho Chi Minh City. The signal is transmitted from the Vietnam Television Center in Ho Chi Minh City to the Vietnam Television headquarters in Hanoi, covering the cities in the Southeast region broadcast on various television platforms to serve audiences nationwide.

On September 8, 2022, the Vietnam Television Center in the Southern region changed its name to the Vietnam Television Center in Ho Chi Minh City, at the same time the Vietnam Television Center in the Southwest region was established.

Despite Nha Trang being located on the South Central Coast of Vietnam and within the VTV8 coverage area, VTV9 also have a representative office in the city meaning Nha Trang is also covered by both VTV8 and VTV9.

== History ==
VTV9 started broadcasting as a regional television channel on October 8, 2007, broadcasting from 6:00 a.m. to 12:00 p.m. daily. It started broadcasts on the Vietnam Cable Television system in Ho Chi Minh City and on DTH satellite digital television, as well as through analog television. Like other regional TV channels at this time, VTV9 mainly broadcast in Ho Chi Minh City and the Southeast region. Although essentially a regional television channel, VTV9 was orientated to be a national television channel since its launch and began nationwide broadcasting on September 13, 2010, while officially remaining a regional channel. 24/7 service began on July 11, 2013, with HD service beginning August 28, 2015, and on September 29 the broadcast was switched to DVB-T2.

On January 1, 2016 VTV9 was merged with another regional channel, VTV Can Tho 1, to form the national channel VTV9. The new channel launched its website and YouTube channel on May 1, 2019. During the COVID-19 pandemic, broadcast hours were cut from 5 a.m to midnight between March 19 and April 2020. The channel resumed full-time service afterward.

== Broadcast hours ==
=== VTV9 (Regional channel) ===
- October 8, 2007 - September 13, 2010:
- 05:30 - 12:00, 17:00 - 24:00 daily.
- 05:30 - 24:00 daily.
- September 13, 2010 - January 1, 2011: 05:30 - 24:00 daily.
- January 1, 2011 - July 11, 2013: 06:00 - 24:00 daily.
- July 11, 2013 - January 1, 2016: 24/7.

=== VTV9 (National channel) ===
- January 1, 2016 - March 19, 2020 and May 1, 2020 – present: 24/7.
- March 19, 2020 - May 1, 2020: 05:00 – 24:00 daily.

== Management ==
Name	Role
Tu Luong	Director of Vietnam Central Television in Ho Chi Minh City.
Nguyen Chi Hung	Deputy Director of Vietnam Central Television in Ho Chi Minh City.
Ngo Truong Son	Deputy Director of Vietnam Central Television in Ho Chi Minh City.
Tran Thanh Minh	Deputy Director of Vietnam Central Television in Ho Chi Minh City.
