= VTV7 =

Vietnamese educational television channel

- VTV7 logo from 7 September 2026
- Country: Vietnam
- Broadcast area: Vietnam; Worldwide
- Headquarters: 43 Nguyen Chi Thanh street, Giang Vo commune, Hanoi capital, Vietnam

Programming
- Languages: Vietnamese; English; Mandarin; Korean; Japanese
- Picture format: 1080i HDTV

Ownership
- Owner: Vietnam Television

History
- Launched: 1 January 2016

Links
- Website: vtv7.vtv.vn

Availability

Terrestrial
- Digital: CH.7
- Thaicom 6: 4034 H 19200

VTV7 is the national educational television channel of Vietnam Television, aiming to teach, disseminate, and enhance knowledge for students, children, and all audiences nationwide. VTV7 is a product of the collaboration between the Specialized Programs - Science and Education Department of Vietnam Television and the Ministry of Education and Training of Vietnam, along with partners including the Educational Broadcasting System and NHK.

VTV7 began its trial broadcast at 11:30 AM on November 20, 2015, on the Vietnam Cable Television system, DVB-T2 terrestrial digital television, and K+ satellite digital television. During the trial broadcast period, VTV7 only showed trailers of its programs until December 31, 2015, and began regular programming on January 1, 2016. Its launching ceremony was broadcast on January 8, 2016.

On June 15, 2025, VTV7 broadcast a sports event live for the first time, featuring a live commentary of a match from the V.League 1. Since then, in addition to its primary focus on educational and informative content, VTV7 has also become known as a channel that frequently provides live coverage of various domestic and international sports events. Following the relaunch of VTV6 as a dedicated sports channel, VTV7 now only broadcasts sports events live when VTV6’s schedule is already fully occupied with other live coverage at the same time.
