= VTV8 =

Vietnamese TV channel for central Vietnam

- Country: Vietnam
- Broadcast area: Central Vietnam; Central Highlands
- Headquarters: 256 Bạch Đằng St., Hải Châu ward, Đà Nẵng, Vietnam

Programming
- Language: Vietnamese
- Picture format: 1080i HDTV

Ownership
- Owner: Vietnam Television

History
- Launched: 1 January 2016; 10 years ago
- Replaced: VTV Đà Nẵng
- Former names: VTV Đà Nẵng, VTV Huế, VTV Phú Yên

Links
- Webcast: Watch live
- Website: vtv.vn vtv.vn/vtv8.htm

VTV8 is a channel of Vietnam Television, focused on culture, history, heritage, and tourism. Part of VTV's network of broadcast television channels. The channel officially began broadcasting at 00:00 on January 1, 2016, as a result of the merging of 3 former television channels of VTV, including VTV Huế, VTV Đà Nẵng and VTV Phú Yên, based on the approved National Press Planning Project. VTV8 specializes in producing programs targeting Central Vietnam, and also produces many live broadcasts of events in this area for live transmission on VTV channels.

== History ==
=== VTV Da Nang ===
Before 2016, in addition to producing the program TV, VTV Da Nang also took on the task of regional broadcasting and relaying the broadcast channels of VTV. Every year, VTV Da Nang produces more than 100 programs including news bulletins, many categories, products of art, science, entertainment of the same class. variety of programs are selected, exploited from many sources to meet viewers requirements. In addition, VTVDa Nang also participates in direct production of many major programs in the region such as: Coffee Festival Buon Me Thuot, Gong Festival Central Highlands, Quang Nam - Festival of Heritage Journeys, The Ceremony Danang International Fireworks Festival, the soccer awards, the sports tournaments in the area... VTV Da Nang is also the successful organizer of the events. VTV's programs and contests such as Sao Mai, Round K National Robocon festival and ABU Robocon 2013, 31st National Television Festival... VTV Da Nang coverage area was Da Nang city, Quang Nam, Quang Ngai, Kon Tum, Gia Lai, and Đắk Lắk provinces.

With VTV equipped with HD standard color car in 2015, the channel began to be broadcast in the picture format 16:9. From January 1st, 2016, implementing the scheme of system structure television, VTV Da Nang stopped broadcasting regionally and together with VTV Hue, VTV Phu Yen produce programs for TV channel country VTV8 and Da Nang was also selected as the place to the total control of VTV8 channel.

=== VTV Phu Yen ===
From broadcasting 3 times a week when it was first established, in 1991, the station broadcasts television daily on PTV channel. Due to the increase in broadcast time, in addition to self-produced programs, exchanging programs with other stations, PTV also pays great attention to the exploitation of programs by foreign stations via satellite. fine to compile and edit. In 1990, when VTV had not yet covered the whole country, PTV exploited and compiled daily current news international news. June 6 of the same year, Radio held live commentary 1990 World Cup. In Central at that time, PTV was the only station broadcasting this event live. At the beginning of 1992, PTV aired the Mexican TV series Rich people also cry, then shared it with many other stations in the country to broadcast, creating a phenomenon television in Vietnam.

On August 22, 2001, Prime Minister Government signed the decision to become Establishment of Radio Television Area Phu Yen, later the Center of Vietnamese Literature in Phu Yen on the basis of transferring THPY Station managed by the province Phu Yen to Phu Yen Vietnam Television, acting as the unit television of the province as well as the region South Central Coast. With strong investment and requiring professional qualifications commensurate with national television stations in the region, the team of VTV Phu Yen is constantly growing in quantity and quality. In charge of producing programs for VTV in 6 provinces Binh Dinh, Phu Yen, Khanh Hoa, Ninh Thuan, Binh Thuan and Lam Dong.

After 14 years of broadcasting VTV Phu Yen, from January 1st, 2016, VTV Phu Yen, with VTV Hue and VTV Da Nang merged into VTV8. In 2018, VTV established a Vietnamese Media Center at Nha Trang, Khanh Hoa, replacing the VTV Phu Yen ago.

=== VTV Hue ===
Broadcasting before 1975, VTV Hue its Television Channel in Hue city, Thua Thien. Name called HTV in Hue television Station. Broadcast 6:00am to 11:00 pm. In January 1st, 2016, VTV Hue stopped broadcasting and merged into VTV8. VTV Hue coverage area were Hue city and Quảng Trị province.

== Airtime duration ==
=== VTV Da Nang ===
Daily:

- 2004 – 2010: 06h00 – 23h00.

=== VTV Phu Yen ===
- July – October 1989: 07h00 – 10:00, 12h00 – 15:00, 20h00 – 24h00
- October 1989: 06:00–08:00, 10:00–12:00, 14:00–16:00, 18:00–20:00, 22:00
- February 3, 1991 – August 10, 1999: Aired daily from 18:00–23:00.
- From August 10, 1999: 08:00–12:00, 18:00–23:00.
- 2004 – 2010: 10:00–13:30, 17:00–23:00.

=== VTV Hue ===
- 2004-2010: 06:00-23:00

== See also ==
- Da Nang
- Hue
- Vietnam Television
