= Adrift (2009 Vietnamese film) =

- Directed by: Bui Thac Chuyen
- Written by: Phan Đăng Di
- Starring: Linh Dan Pham; Do Thi Hai Yen; Johnny Tri Nguyen; Nguyen Duy Khoa
- Cinematography: Ly Thai Dung
- Edited by: Feature Film Studio n°1 (Vietnam); Acrobates Films (France)
- Music by: Ngoc Dai
- Release dates: September 6, 2009 (Venice); November 13, 2010 (Vietnam)
- Running time: 110 minutes
- Country: Vietnam
- Languages: Vietnamese, French

Adrift (Vietnamese: Chơi vơi) is a 2009 Vietnamese film directed by Bui Thac Chuyen and stars Đỗ Thị Hải Yến, Linh Dan Pham, Johnny Tri Nguyen and Nguyen Duy Khoa. Hai Yen plays Duyen, a young tourist guide who marries Hai (Duy Khoa), a taxi driver, but her friend and writer Cam (Linh Dan) still has feelings for her. The film deals with issues in modern Vietnam such as homosexuality and loneliness of the young generation. The film is a co-production between Feature Film Studio n°1 (Vietnam) and Acrobates Films (France).

Adrift was selected to participate in the Venice Film Festival, Toronto International Film Festival and Bangkok International Film Festival. At the 66th Venice International Film Festival, FIPRESCI awarded Adrift with its prize for young directors and cinemas. At the Cines del Sur Festival 2010, the film won the NETPAC award. The film earned three nominations at the 4th Asian Film Awards, including Best Screenwriter, Best Cinematographer, Best Composer.

== Plot ==
Set in modern Hanoi, Adrift begins with the wedding of Duyen and Hai. Duyen is a beautiful tourist guide and translator who marries Hai, a taxi driver who is two years her junior. Duyen thinks the marriage will make her happy but it turns out more difficult, especially since her childlike husband is uninterested in her efforts of intimacy and the marriage remains unconsummated. Cam, secretly in love with Duyen, is bitter about the marriage. Cam has Duyen deliver a letter to Tho, a handsome lothario and tourist guide who physically hurls himself on Duyen when she visits his home to deliver the letter. After Tho reports back to Cam that Duyen is sexually inexperienced, Cam diabolically persuades Duyen to take a temporary job as a translator on one of Tho's beach tours, knowing what will happen. Duyen's time at the beach with Tho results in an affair leading to Duyen's sexual awakening but continued uncertainty about herself, marriage, and life.

== Cast ==
- Do Thi Hai Yen as Duyen (Duyên)
- Linh Dan Pham as Cam (Cầm)
- Johnny Tri Nguyen as Tho (Thổ)
- Nguyen Duy Khoa as Hai (Hải)
- Như Quỳnh as Van (Vân), Hai's mother
- Bui Bai Binh as Dung (Dũng)
- Linh Dung as Vi (Vi)

== Production ==
The movie's screenwriter, Phan Dang Di, is known for writing various works surrounding the topic of agriculture in Vietnam during the country's transitional and integrational period. In 2001, Bui Thac Chuyen received the script for the movie. Throughout production, the two revised the script multiple times. Before being named Adrift, the movie had many alternative titles. Examples include No Matter How Far, You Will Comeback (Đi mãi rồi cũng quay về), The End is The Sea (Tận cùng là biển), and Stuck (Mắc kẹt). Despite repeated denial from the producers, Adrift is generally categorised as a film covering homosexual topics. Because of its contents, the film went through multiple rounds of review in a span of 7 years before receiving approval. The movie is the first ever Vietnamese movie to feature lesbian themes.

Producer Dang Tat Binh shared that the movie required a budget of 7 billion Vietnamese dong ($265,860 in 2026). However, the government could only sponsor 1.6 billion Vietnamese dong ($60,768 in 2026), forcing the crew to find alternative sources of funding. The Hubert Bals Fund from the International Film Festival Rotterdam and the Fonds Sud Cinéma Fund from France contributed a total of €130 thousand.

== Release ==
In September 2009, the film was premiered at the 66th Venice International Film Festival. Afterwards, the film was also screened at the 2009 Toronto International Film Festival, Bangkok International Film Festival, Vancouver International Film Festival, Festival International du Film Francophone de Namur, Busan International Film Festival, and BFI London Film Festival. In November of the same year, the movie was released in Vietnamese theatres.

In the following year, Adrift continued to be screened at various film festivals. These include the Jerusalem International Film Festival and the Melbourne International Film Festival.

In March 2010, Adrift was selected by the Global Film Initiative to be screened at the Letelier Theatre in Washington, D.C. Starting from January of the same year, the film embarked on a year-long tour in the US and Canada. In April, the film was a nominee at the 17th Titanic International Film Festival in Budapest, Hungary.

In February 2011, the film premiered in French theatres under the title Vertiges.

== Critical reception ==
=== United States of America ===
Stephen Holden of The New York Times commented "'Adrift' ('Choi Voi') ... is a subtle, melancholy exploration of erotic angst and uncomfortable awakening."

=== France ===
The movie received generally positive reviews from critics in the country. Eric Loret of Libération applauded the director's choice of filming in a continuous sequence, giving the film a natural feel and grabbing the audience's attention. It is also noted that since the film is from a women's perspective, the men of the film is reduced to mere "objects". Jean Luc Douin of Le Monde mentioned the usage of water in the movie as "omnipresent, a symbol of sexuality". Adrien Gombeaud of Les Echos stated "[Adrift] has everything one would expect from an "Asian film", at least since Wong Kar-wai: aesthetic refinement, latent sensuality and testimony to the mores of a society."

=== Vietnam ===
Ngo Phuong Lan of Tuổi Trẻ assessed that the "novelty" and "oddity" of the film led to its success.

The novelty lies in the filmmaker's ability to depict an ordinary life that flows naturally. This appearance of effortlessness, however, was the result of meticulous and logical planning. Although the cast is small, the film was still able to portray a diverse range of lives in an urbanising city, of a developing country. The oddity lies in the fact that the director was able to achieve two things. First, visualise the characters' emotions and moods. Second, simultaneously push those emotions and moods into an enigmatic shape.

== Awards and nominations ==
Year	Award	Category	Recipient(s)	Result	Ref.
2009	66th Venice International Film Festival	FIPRESCI Award	Adrift	Won	
2009	66th Venice International Film Festival	Orizzonti Award	Adrift	Nominated	
2009	Bangkok International Film Festival	Golden Kinnaree Award	Adrift	Nominated	
2009	Vancouver International Film Festival	Dragons and Tigers Award	Adrift	Nominated	
2009	Vietnam Film Festival	Golden Lotus Prize	Adrift	Certificate	
2009	Vietnam Film Festival	Outstanding Director	Bui Thac Chuyen	Won	
2009	Vietnam Film Festival	Outstanding Cinematography	Ly Thai Dung	Won	
2009	Vietnam Film Festival	Outstanding Graphic Design	La Quy Tung	Won	
2009	Three Continents Festival	Montgolfière d'Or	Adrift	Nominated	
2009	Cinemanila International Film Festival	Best Southeast Asian Film	Adrift	Nominated	
2010	Kite Awards	Golden Kite Prize for Film	Adrift	Nominated	
2010	Kite Awards	Outstanding Supporting Actress	Linh Dung	Won	
2010	Cines del Sur	Alhambra Award	Adrift	Certificate	
2010	Cines del Sur	NETPAC Award	Adrift	Won	
2010	Fribourg International Film Festival	Main Prize	Adrift	Nominated	
2010	Asian Film Awards	Best Screenplay	Phan Dang Di	Nominated	
2010	Asian Film Awards	Best Cinematographer	Ly Thai Dung	Nominated	
2010	Asian Film Awards	Best Composer	Hoang Ngoc Dai	Nominated	
2010	Spirit of Fire Film Festival	Bronze Taiga	Adrift	Won	
