= Story of Pao =

- The film poster.
- Directed by: Ngô Quang Hải
- Written by: Ngô Quang Hải
- Based on: "Tiếng đàn môi sau bờ rào đá" by Đỗ Bích Thúy
- Produced by: Đặng Tất Bình
- Starring: Đỗ Thị Hải Yến; Như Quỳnh; Lý Thanh Kha; Trần Doãn Tuấn; Đỗ Hoa Thúy
- Music by: Nguyễn Thiện Đạo
- Release date: April 10, 2006
- Country: Vietnam
- Language: Vietnamese

Story of Pao or Pao's Story (Vietnamese: Chuyện của Pao) is a 2006 Vietnamese film. It stars Đỗ Thị Hải Yến who also starred in The Quiet American, and was directed and written by her husband Ngô Quang Hải. It is set among the Hmong people of North Vietnam. The film had premiered in the First Films World Competition section of the 30th Montreal World Film Festival. It also won four Golden Kite Prizes (the Oscars of Vietnam).

== Actors ==
- Đỗ Thị Hải Yến as Pao
- Như Quỳnh as Mrs. Kía
- Lý Thanh Kha as Mr. Chúng
- Đỗ Hoa Thúy as Mrs. Sim
- Trần Doãn Tuấn as Chử
