= Satellite Award for Best Actress in a Supporting Role =

Award presented annually by the International Press Academy

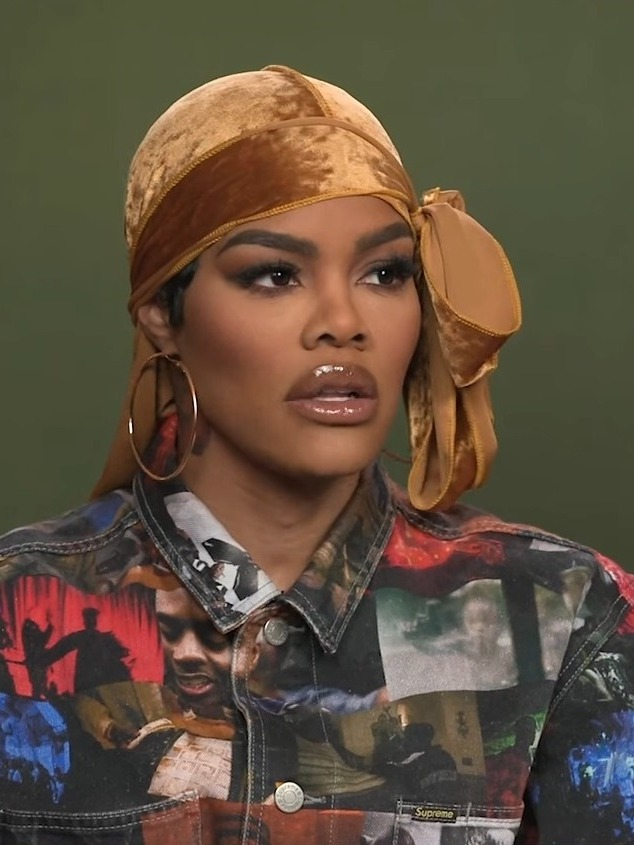
- The 2025 recipient: Teyana Taylor
- Awarded for: Best Actress in a Supporting Role
- Country: United States
- Presented by: International Press Academy
- First award: 1996
- Currently held by: Teyana Taylor – One Battle After Another (2025)

The Satellite Award for Best Actress in a Supporting Role is one of the Satellite Awards presented annually by the International Press Academy. From 1996 to 2005, two categories were presented for supporting performances by male actors, one for performances in a drama film and other for performances in comedy or musical films. In 2006, both categories were merged into the current category without distinction by genre.

== Winners and nominees ==
indicates the winner

=== Drama (1996–2005) ===
Year	Actress	Film	Role
1996	Courtney Love	The People vs. Larry Flynt	Althea Flynt
1996	Joan Allen	The Crucible	Elizabeth Proctor
1996	Stockard Channing	Moll Flanders	Mrs. Allworthy
1996	Miranda Richardson	The Evening Star	Patsy Carpenter
1996	Kate Winslet	Hamlet	Ophelia
1997	Julianne Moore	Boogie Nights	Maggie / Amber Waves
1997	Minnie Driver	Good Will Hunting	Skylar
1997	Ashley Judd	Kiss the Girls	Dr. Kate McTiernan
1997	Debbi Morgan	Eve's Bayou	Mozelle Batiste Delacroix
1997	Sigourney Weaver	The Ice Storm	Janey Carver
1998	Kimberly Elise	Beloved	Denver
1998	Kathy Burke	Dancing at Lughnasa	Maggie Mundy
1998	Beverly D'Angelo	American History X	Doris Vinyard
1998	Thandie Newton	Beloved	Beloved
1998	Lynn Redgrave	Gods and Monsters	Hanna
1999	Chloë Sevigny	Boys Don't Cry	Lana Tisdel
1999	Erykah Badu	The Cider House Rules	Rose Rose
1999	Charlize Theron	The Cider House Rules	Candy Kendall
1999	Toni Collette	The Sixth Sense	Lynn Sear
1999	Jessica Lange	Titus	Tamora
1999	Sissy Spacek	The Straight Story	Rose Straight
2000	Jennifer Ehle	Sunshine	Younger Valerie Sonnenschein (Sors)
2000	Rosemary Harris	Sunshine	Senior Valerie Sors
2000	Judi Dench	Chocolat	Armande Voizin
2000	Catherine Deneuve	Dancer in the Dark	Kathy
2000	Samantha Morton	Jesus' Son	Michelle
2000	Julie Walters	Billy Elliot	Sandra Wilkinson
2000	Kate Winslet	Quills	Madeleine "Maddy" LeClerc
2001	Jennifer Connelly	A Beautiful Mind	Alicia Nash
2001	Fionnula Flanagan	The Others	Bertha Mills
2001	Brittany Murphy	Don't Say a Word	Elisabeth Burrows
2001	Julia Stiles	The Business of Strangers	Paula Murphy
2001	Marisa Tomei	In the Bedroom	Natalie Strout
2001	Kate Winslet	Iris	Young Iris
2002	Edie Falco	Sunshine State	Marly Temple
2002	Kathy Bates	About Schmidt	Roberta Hertzel
2002	Do Thi Hai Yen	The Quiet American	Phuong
2002	Julianne Moore	The Hours	Laura Brown
2002	Miranda Richardson	Spider	Yvonne/Mrs. Cleg
2002	Renée Zellweger	White Oleander	Claire Richards
2003	Maria Bello	The Cooler	Natalie Belisario
2003	Annette Bening	Open Range	Sue Barlow
2003	Sarah Bolger	In America	Christy Sullivan
2003	Patricia Clarkson	The Station Agent	Olivia Harris
2003	Marcia Gay Harden	Mystic River	Celeste Samarco Boyle
2003	Holly Hunter	Thirteen	Melanie Freeland
2004	Gena Rowlands	The Notebook	Old Allie Calhoun
2004	Cate Blanchett	The Aviator	Katharine Hepburn
2004	Daryl Hannah	Kill Bill: Volume 2	Elle Driver
2004	Laura Linney	Kinsey	Clara McMillen
2004	Natalie Portman	Closer	Alice Ayres / Jane Jones
2004	Kyra Sedgwick	The Woodsman	Vicki
2005	Laura Linney	The Squid and the Whale	Joan Berkman
2005	Amy Adams	Junebug	Ashley Johnsten
2005	Maria Bello	A History of Violence	Edie Stall
2005	Gong Li	Memoirs of a Geisha	Hatsumomo
2005	Shirley MacLaine	In Her Shoes	Ella Hirsch
2005	Frances McDormand	North Country	Glory Dodge

=== Musical or Comedy (1996–2005) ===
Year	Actress	Film	Role
1996	Debbie Reynolds	Mother	Beatrice Henderson
1996	Lauren Bacall	The Mirror Has Two Faces	Hannah Morgan
1996	Goldie Hawn	Everyone Says I Love You	Steffi Dandridge
1996	Sarah Jessica Parker	The First Wives Club	Shelly Stewart
1996	Renée Zellweger	Jerry Maguire	Dorothy Boyd
1997	Joan Cusack	In & Out	Emily Montgomery
1997	Cameron Diaz	My Best Friend's Wedding	Kimberly "Kimmy" Wallace
1997	Linda Fiorentino	Men in Black	Dr. Laurel Weaver / Agent L
1997	Anne Heche	Wag the Dog	Winifred Ames
1997	Shirley Knight	As Good as It Gets	Beverly Connelly
1998	Joan Allen	Pleasantville	Betty Parker
1998	Kathy Bates	Primary Colors	Libby Holden
1998	Brenda Blethyn	Little Voice	Mari Hoff
1998	Julianne Moore	The Big Lebowski	Maude Lebowski
1998	Joan Plowright	Dance with Me	Bea Johnson
1999	Catherine Keener	Being John Malkovich	Maxine Lund
1999	Cameron Diaz	Being John Malkovich	Lotte Schwartz
1999	Cate Blanchett	An Ideal Husband	Lady Gertrude Chiltern
1999	Samantha Morton	Sweet and Lowdown	Hattie
1999	Antonia San Juan	All About My Mother	Agrado
1999	Tori Spelling	Trick	Katherine Lambert
2000	Kate Hudson	Almost Famous	Pennie Lane
2000	Holly Hunter	O Brother, Where Art Thou?	Penny Wharvey-McGill
2000	Frances McDormand	Almost Famous	Elaine Miller
2000	Catherine O'Hara	Best in Show	Cookie Fleck
2000	Rebecca Pidgeon	State and Main	Ann
2000	Marisa Tomei	What Women Want	Lola
2001	Maggie Smith	Gosford Park	Constance, Countess of Trentham
2001	Anjelica Huston	The Royal Tenenbaums	Etheline Tenenbaum
2001	Gwyneth Paltrow	The Royal Tenenbaums	Margot Helen Tenenbaum
2001	Helen Mirren	Gosford Park	Mrs Wilson
2001	Emily Watson	Gosford Park	Elsie
2001	Miriam Shor	Hedwig and the Angry Inch	Yitzhak
2002	Tovah Feldshuh	Kissing Jessica Stein	Judy Stein
2002	Toni Collette	About a Boy	Fiona Brewer
2002	Lainie Kazan	My Big Fat Greek Wedding	Maria Portokalos
2002	Emily Mortimer	Lovely & Amazing	Elizabeth Marks
2002	Bebe Neuwirth	Tadpole	Dianne Lodder
2002	Meryl Streep	Adaptation.	Susan Orlean
2003	Patricia Clarkson	Pieces of April	Joy Burns
2003	Scarlett Johansson	Lost in Translation	Charlotte
2003	Shaheen Khan	Bend It Like Beckham	Mrs "Sukhi" Kaur Bhamra
2003	Catherine O'Hara	A Mighty Wind	Mickey Crabbe
2003	Emma Thompson	Love Actually	Karen
2003	Julie Walters	Calendar Girls	Annie Clarke
2004	Regina King	Ray	Margie Hendrix
2004	Lynn Collins	The Merchant of Venice	Portia
2004	Minnie Driver	The Phantom of the Opera	Carlotta Giudicelli
2004	Cloris Leachman	Spanglish	Evelyn Wright
2004	Virginia Madsen	Sideways	Maya Randall
2004	Sharon Warren	Ray	Aretha Robinson
2005	Rosario Dawson	Rent	Mimi Marquez
2005	America Ferrera	The Sisterhood of the Traveling Pants	Carmen Lowell
2005	Diane Keaton	The Family Stone	Sybil Stone
2005	Rachel McAdams	The Family Stone	Amy Stone
2005	Michelle Monaghan	Kiss Kiss Bang Bang	Harmony Faith Lane
2005	Yuen Qiu	Kung Fu Hustle	Landlady of Pig Sty Alley

=== Motion Picture ===
Year	Actress	Film	Role
2006	Jennifer Hudson	Dreamgirls	Effie White
2006	Cate Blanchett	Notes on a Scandal	Bathsheba "Sheba" Hart
2006	Abigail Breslin	Little Miss Sunshine	Olive Hoover
2006	Blythe Danner	The Last Kiss	Anna
2006	Lily Tomlin	A Prairie Home Companion	Rhonda Johnson
2006	Rinko Kikuchi	Babel	Chieko Wataya
2007	Amy Ryan	Gone Baby Gone	Helene McCready
2007	Ruby Dee	American Gangster	Mama Lucas
2007	Taraji P. Henson	Talk to Me	Vernell Watson
2007	Saoirse Ronan	Atonement	Briony Tallis (age 13)
2007	Emmanuelle Seigner	La Vie en Rose (La môme)	Titine
2007	Tilda Swinton	Michael Clayton	Karen Crowder
2008	Rosemarie DeWitt	Rachel Getting Married	Rachel Buchman
2008	Penélope Cruz	Elegy	Consuela Castillo
2008	Anjelica Huston	Choke	Ida J. Mancini
2008	Beyoncé	Cadillac Records	Etta James
2008	Sophie Okonedo	The Secret Life of Bees	May Boatwright
2008	Emma Thompson	Brideshead Revisited	Lady Marchmain
2009	Mo'Nique	Precious	Mary Lee Johnston
2009	Emily Blunt	Sunshine Cleaning	Norah Lorkowski
2009	Penélope Cruz	Nine	Carla Albanese
2009	Anna Kendrick	Up in the Air	Natalie Keener
2009	Mozhan Marno	The Stoning of Soraya M.	Soraya M.
2010	Jacki Weaver	Animal Kingdom	Janine "Smurf" Cody
2010	Amy Adams	The Fighter	Charlene Fleming
2010	Marion Cotillard	Inception	Mallorie "Mal" Cobb
2010	Anne-Marie Duff	Nowhere Boy	Julia Lennon
2010	Rosamund Pike	Barney's Version	Miriam
2010	Vanessa Redgrave	Letters to Juliet	Claire Smith-Wyman
2010	Kristin Scott Thomas	Nowhere Boy	Mimi Smith
2010	Dianne Wiest	Rabbit Hole	Nat
2011	Jessica Chastain	The Tree of Life	Mrs. O'Brien
2011	Elle Fanning	Super 8	Alice "Allie" Dainard
2011	Lisa Féret	Mozart's Sister	Princess Louise of France
2011	Judy Greer	The Descendants	Julie Speer
2011	Rachel McAdams	Midnight in Paris	Inez
2011	Janet McTeer	Albert Nobbs	Hubert Page
2011	Carey Mulligan	Shame	Sissy Sullivan
2011	Vanessa Redgrave	Coriolanus	Volumnia
2011	Octavia Spencer	The Help	Minerva "Minny" Jackson
2011	Kate Winslet	Carnage	Nancy Cowan
2012	Anne Hathaway	Les Misérables	Fantine
2012	Amy Adams	The Master	Peggy Dodd
2012	Samantha Barks	Les Misérables	Éponine
2012	Judi Dench	Skyfall	M
2012	Hélène Florent	Café de Flore	Carole
2012	Helen Hunt	The Sessions	Cheryl Cohen-Greene
2013	June Squibb	Nebraska	Kate Grant
2013	Sally Hawkins	Blue Jasmine	Ginger
2013	Jennifer Lawrence	American Hustle	Rosalyn Rosenfeld
2013	Lupita Nyong'o	12 Years a Slave	Patsey
2013	Julia Roberts	August: Osage County	Barbara Weston-Fordham
2013	Léa Seydoux	Blue Is the Warmest Colour	Emma
2013	Emily Watson	The Book Thief	Rosa Hubermann
2013	Oprah Winfrey	The Butler	Gloria Gaines
2014	Patricia Arquette	Boyhood	Olivia Evans
2014	Laura Dern	Wild	Bobbi Grey
2014	Keira Knightley	The Imitation Game	Joan Clarke
2014	Emma Stone	Birdman	Sam Thomson
2014	Tilda Swinton	Snowpiercer	Minister Mason
2014	Katherine Waterston	Inherent Vice	Shasta Fay Hepworth
2015	Alicia Vikander	The Danish Girl	Gerda Wegener
2015	Elizabeth Banks	Love & Mercy	Melinda Ledbetter
2015	Jane Fonda	Youth	Brenda Morel
2015	Rachel McAdams	Spotlight	Sacha Pfeiffer
2015	Rooney Mara	Carol	Therese Belivet
2015	Kate Winslet	Steve Jobs	Joanna Hoffman
2016	Naomie Harris	Moonlight	Paula
2016	Viola Davis	Fences	Rose Maxson
2016	Nicole Kidman	Lion	Sue Brierley
2016	Helen Mirren	Eye in the Sky	Colonel Katherine Powell
2016	Octavia Spencer	Hidden Figures	Dorothy Vaughan
2016	Michelle Williams	Manchester by the Sea	Randi Chandler
2017	Lois Smith	Marjorie Prime	Marjorie Lancaster
2017	Mary J. Blige	Mudbound	Florence Jackson
2017	Holly Hunter	The Big Sick	Beth Gardner
2017	Allison Janney	I, Tonya	LaVona Golden
2017	Melissa Leo	Novitiate	Reverend Mother Marie St. Clair
2017	Laurie Metcalf	Lady Bird	Marion McPherson
2018	Regina King	If Beale Street Could Talk	Sharon Rivers
2018	Claire Foy	First Man	Janet Armstrong
2018	Nicole Kidman	Boy Erased	Nancy Eamons
2018	Margot Robbie	Mary Queen of Scots	Queen Elizabeth I
2018	Emma Stone	The Favourite	Abigail Masham
2018	Rachel Weisz	The Favourite	Sarah Churchill
2019	Jennifer Lopez	Hustlers	Ramona Vega
2019	Penélope Cruz	Pain and Glory	Jacinta
2019	Laura Dern	Marriage Story	Nora Fanshaw
2019	Nicole Kidman	Bombshell	Gretchen Carlson
2019	Margot Robbie	Bombshell	Kayla Pospisil
2019	Zhao Shuzhen	The Farewell	Nai Nai
2020	Amanda Seyfried	Mank	Marion Davies
2020	Ellen Burstyn	Pieces of a Woman	Elizabeth Weiss
2020	Olivia Colman	The Father	Anne
2020	Nicole Kidman	The Prom	Angie Dickinson
2020	Youn Yuh-jung	Minari	Soon-ja
2020	Helena Zengel	News of the World	Johanna Leonberger / Cicada
2021	Kirsten Dunst	The Power of the Dog	Rose Gordon
2021	Caitríona Balfe	Belfast	Ma
2021	Judi Dench	Belfast	Granny
2021	Aunjanue Ellis	King Richard	Oracene "Brandy" Price
2021	Marlee Matlin	CODA	Jackie Rossi
2021	Ruth Negga	Passing	Clare Bellew
2022	Claire Foy	Women Talking	Salome Friesen
2022	Angela Bassett	Black Panther: Wakanda Forever	Queen Ramonda
2022	Kerry Condon	The Banshees of Inisherin	Siobhán Súilleabháin
2022	Jamie Lee Curtis	Everything Everywhere All at Once	Deirdre Beaubeirdre
2022	Dolly de Leon	Triangle of Sadness	Abigail
2022	Jean Smart	Babylon	Elinor St. John
2023	Da’Vine Joy Randolph	The Holdovers	Mary Lamb
2023	Juliette Binoche	The Taste of Things	Eugénie
2023	Emily Blunt	Oppenheimer	Katherine "Kitty" Oppenheimer
2023	America Ferrera	Barbie	Gloria
2023	Julianne Moore	May December	Gracie Atherton-Yoo
2023	Rosamund Pike	Saltburn	Lady Elspeth Catton
2024	Ariana Grande	Wicked	Galinda "Glinda" Upland
2024	Danielle Deadwyler	The Piano Lesson	Berniece Charles
2024	Felicity Jones	The Brutalist	Erzsébet Tóth
2024	Margaret Qualley	The Substance	Sue
2024	Isabella Rossellini	Conclave	Sister Agnes
2024	Zoe Saldaña	Emilia Pérez	Rita Mora Castro
2025	Teyana Taylor	One Battle After Another	Perfidia Beverly Hills
2025	Elle Fanning	Sentimental Value	Rachel Kemp
2025	Ariana Grande	Wicked: For Good	Galinda "Glinda" Upland
2025	Inga Ibsdotter Lilleaas	Sentimental Value	Agnes Borg Pettersen
2025	Amy Madigan	Weapons	Gladys
2025	Wunmi Mosaku	Sinners	Annie

== See also ==
- Academy Award for Best Supporting Actress
- Independent Spirit Award for Best Supporting Female
