= Zecchi =

Zecchi is a surname. Notable people with the surname include:

- Barbara Zecchi, Italian feminist film scholar, film critic, videoessayist, and film festival curator
- Carlo Zecchi (1903–1984), Italian pianist, music teacher, and conductor
