= Đỗ Thị Hải Yến =

Vietnamese actress

Do Thi Hai Yen
- Đỗ Thị Hải Yến
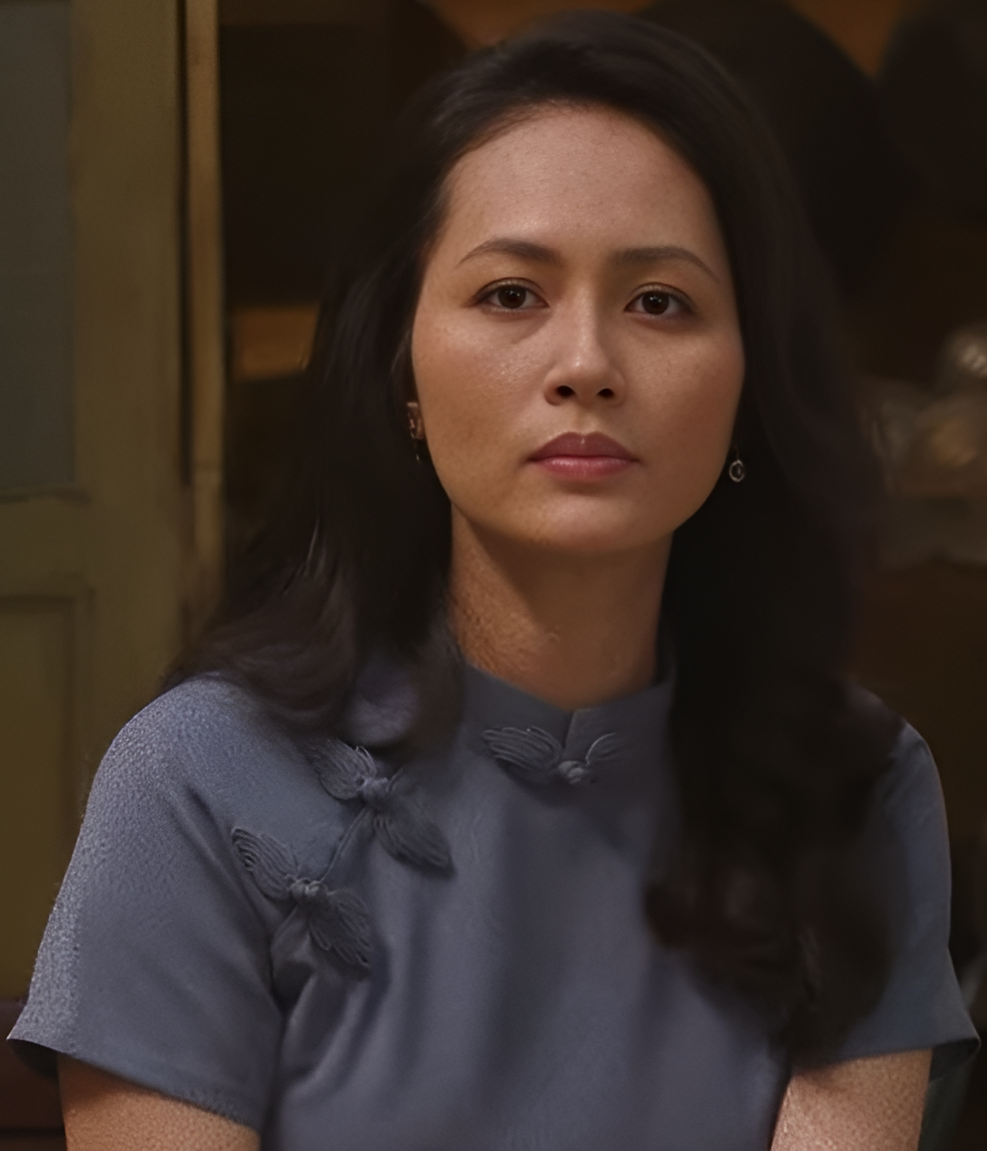
- Yến in 2025
- Born: Đỗ Thị Hải Yến; October 1, 1982 (age 44); Bac Ninh Province, Vietnam
- Education: Vietnam Academy of Dance
- Occupation: Actress

Do Thi Hai Yen (born 1 October 1982) is a Vietnamese actress. She rose to international fame for her role in Academy Award-nominated film The Quiet American (2002) by Phillip Noyce, which made her the first Asian actress to be nominated for a Satellite Award. For her breakthrough performance in the drama film Story of Pao (2005), Yen won Best Actress awards at the 4th Vietnam Cinema Association's Golden Kite Awards and 15th Vietnam Film Festival. She gained further acclaim for her performances in Adrift (2009), The Floating Lives (2010) and Big Father, Small Father and Other Stories (2015).

== Early life ==
Yến was born on October 1, 1982, in Bac Ninh Province, Vietnam. She grew up in Hanoi where she graduated from the Vietnamese Ballet School (now Vietnam Academy of Dance) after 7 years of study.

== Career ==
In 1999, director Tran Anh Hung invited Yen, who is 17 at that time, to play a role in the film The Vertical Ray of the Sun (Vietnam/France).

In 2000, Yen appeared again in the film Song of the Stork (Vũ khúc con cò), a co-production between Vietnam and Singapore, directed by Nguyễn Phan Quang Bình (Vietnam) and Jonathan Foo (Singapore). The film had its world premiere at the 26th Montreal World Film Festival during the World Cinema section.

In 2001, Yen became a leading actress in Vietnam when she was selected in a competition attended by more than 2,000 candidates in Vietnam and overseas to play the main female character next to two world-famous actors, Sir Michael Caine and Brendan Fraser, in The Quiet American directed by Phillip Noyce. It was the first time in Vietnam's history that a Vietnamese actress was selected as a main English-speaking character in a Hollywood film. Hai Yen was nominated for the "Best Actress in a Supporting Role – Drama" at Golden Satellite Award in 2002 for her role in The Quiet American.

In 2005, Yen was the leading actress in Story of Pao (Chuyện của Pao) directed by her ex-husband Ngo Quang Hai. This is the first Vietnamese film she starred as the leading actress. It received the Vietnam Cinema Association's Golden Kite Awards for "Best Feature Film", "Best Actress" (for Hai Yen), "Best Supporting Actress", and "Best Director of Photography", as well as the "Special Jury Award" at the 51st Asia Pacific Film Festival. The film was premiered at various film festivals, including the 30th Montreal World Film Festival (First Film World Competition), the Pusan International Film Festival in 2006 (A Window on Asian Cinema & Curtain Call Stars section), the 17th Cinequest Film Festival (Maverick Narrative Competition), and the Bangkok International Film Festival in 2007 (ASEAN Film Competition). Story of Pao was also Hai Yen's first movie as a producer, taking care of the film's marketing and distribution. In 2006, Do Thi Hai Yen was one of 19 promising Asian actors and actresses to get to introduce during the summit of "Star Summit Asia - Curtain Call" when Story of Pao was premiered at Busan International Film Festival. It was Vietnam's official submission to the Best Foreign Language Film at the Oscars 2007. At the 15th Vietnam Film Festival in 2007, the film was awarded the Silver Lotus and the Best Actress Award for Hai Yen.

In 2008, Yen was the leading actress in the film Adrift (Chơi vơi), a co-production between Vietnam and France, directed by Bùi Thạc Chuyên. In September 2009, the film was released at the 66th Venice International Film Festival, where it won FIPRESCI award. The film subsequently premiered at the 2009 Toronto International Film Festival, 53rd BFI London Film Festival, 2009 Vancouver International Film Festival, 2009 Cinemanila International Film Festival, 2010 Fribourg International Film Festival, 2010 Melbourne International Film Festival and 2010 International Film Festival Rotterdam. For her admirable performance in this film, she received Best Actress nomination at the 2009 Golden Kite Awards.

In 2010, Yen starred in film The Floating Lives (Cánh đồng bất tận), directed by Nguyen Phan Quang Binh. The film was based on Nguyen Ngoc Tu's best selling short story "Boundless Rice Field", winner of the best short story prize from the Vietnam Writer's Association in 2007 and the Asean Literature Award recently. The film was premiered in the 15th Busan International Film Festival in the New Currents category. The film won the Silver Lotus Prize at the Vietnam Cinema Association's Golden Kite Awards and earned her the Best Actress award at the Viet Film Fest in 2010.

In 2015, Yen starred in the film Big Father, Small Father and Other Stories (Cha và con và...) directed by Phan Dang Di, which became the first film by a Vietnamese director to enter the main competition section for the Golden Bear at the Berlin International Film Festival.

== Endorsements and fashion ==
Yen is a brand ambassador in Vietnam for several brands including Motorola V8Luxury and Escada. She also became a guest at events of luxury brands such as Louis Vuitton, Chopard and Dior. In August 2024, she was selected to become the ambassador in Vietnam for the Menard Embellir product line from Japanese luxury skincare brand Menard.

== Filmography ==
Year	Title	Role	Notes
2000	The Vertical Ray of the Sun	Quoc's concubine	
2002	Song of the Stork	Hoai	
2002	The Quiet American	Phuong	
2006	Story of Pao	Pao	
2009	Adrift	Duyen	
2010	The Floating Lives	Suong	
2015	Big Father, Small Father and Other Stories	Van	
2025	Ky Nam Inn	Kỳ Nam	

== Awards ==
- Nominated - Satellite Award for Best Supporting Actress - Motion Picture in 2002 for her role in The Quiet American.
- Vietnam Cinema Association's Golden Kite Award for Best Actress in 2006 for her role in Story of Pao.
- Curtain Call – the summit of emerging Asian stars at Pusan International Film Festival in 2006.
- Vietnam Film Festival - Golden Lotus for Best Actress in 2007 for her role in Story of Pao.
- Nominated - Vietnam Cinema Association's Golden Kite Award for Best Actress in 2009 for her role in Adrift.
- Nominated - Golden Ochna Award for Favourite Female Film Actress in 2010 for her role in The Floating Lives.
- Viet Film Fest – Best Actress Award for her role in The Floating Lives, 2010.
- Member of the International Jury for the Featured film Competition "EurAsia" in Tallinn Black Nights Film Festival.
- Member of the International Jury for the Featured Film Competition at Meridian Film Festival.
- Member of the Jury for the Featured Film Competition at Vietnam Cinema Association's Golden Kite Awards.
