= 15th Vietnam Film Festival =

Liên hoan phim Việt Nam lần thứ 15 (15th Vietnam Film Festival)
- Location: Nam Định, Vietnam
- Founded: 1970
- Awards: Golden Lotus: Hà Nội, Hà Nội (Feature); Sự sống ở rừng Cúc Phương (Documentary)
- Hosted by: Tuấn Tú, Lã Thanh Huyền
- Festival date: November 20–24, 2007
- Website: 15th Vietnam Film Festival

Vietnam Film Festival chronology
- 16th 14th

The 15th Vietnam Film Festival was held from November 20 to November 24, 2007 in Nam Định City, Nam Định Province, Vietnam, with the slogan "For a reformed and integrated Vietnam cinema" (Vietnamese: "Vì một nền điện ảnh Việt Nam đổi mới và hội nhập").

== Event ==
This is the first Film Festival with the participation of overseas Vietnamese filmmakers and foreign collaborative films. There were 113 films in attendance at the Film Festival: 25 feature films, 9 direct-to-video feature film, 53 documentary films, 9 science films và 17 animated films. The jury only awarded 2 Golden Lotus, one for the feature film: "Hà Nội, Hà Nội" and the other for the science film "Sự sống ở rừng Cúc Phương".

=== Participation ===
This is the first film festival where the feature film section has a very high diversity: foreign elements, privately funded films, films by young directors, high-budget films, etc. The participation of 25 feature films comes from 9 units, of which 5 are state owned and 4 are private.

Within the prescribed time limit (from August 16, 2004 to August 16, 2007), a total of private film studios produced more than 15 feature films, 4-5 times more than at the time of the 14th festival.

As expected by the Organizing Committee, September 6, 2007 is the deadline to register to attend the 15th National Film Festival. But after this date, there are only 18 feature films, of which only the film "Dòng máu anh hùng" of Chánh Phương Film, registering to participate. According to Mr. Lê Ngọc Minh - Deputy Director of the Vietnam Cinema Department, some studios mistook the deadline for September 30, 2007, so the organizers postponed the deadline to this date, so after September 6, the Private film studios continue to receive invitations from the Cinema Department.

The 15th National Film Festival Organizing Committee also sent invitations to foreign film delegations such as the US, Russia, China, Japan, Korea, Laos, Cambodia (including managers, film artists) to attend. Foreign delegations brought films to screen in the outer circle with the nature of welcome, exchange and discussion.

=== Jury ===
The judges were divided into 4 panels with 4 heads including: Đặng Nhật Minh (feature film), Vương Đức (direct-to-video feature film), Trần Thế Dân (documentary and science film), Mai Long (animated film). According to the new regulations of this year's Film Festival, the Head of Jury is also the official spokesman before the mouthpieces about the contents of the Film Festival.

This year, documentaries and scientific films are separated to award the Golden and Silver Lotus Awards, not together as every year.

For feature films, before the first screening of each film, the Organizing Committee will distribute votes to the audience to choose their favorite movies. This is considered an award voted by film festival audiences.

=== Activities ===
Instead of holding the opening ceremony in the hall as usual, the opening ceremony of the 15th Film Festival was held in the square, in front of the Trần Hưng Đạo monument with the participation of thousands of guests and the people of Nam Định city. After the opening ceremony, there will be three large audience interactions with movie artists held at 3 locations: Nam Định City Sports Arena, the square in front of Bùi Chu Church and the square of Phu Day cultural tourist area.

Films participating in the festival will be released in turn at cinemas in Nam Định city: Tháng 8, Kim Đồng, Minh Khai, Student Cinema Center. Movie screenings in the evening will feature artists interacting with the audience. On this occasion, a talk and professional exchange at Vị Hoàng Hotel on the morning of November 22 was held to discuss the direction for Vietnamese cinema in the trend of integration and development, with the participation of many experts. face of international guests.

Festival followed the schedule below:

- November 21: Meeting of delegation leaders, press conference, offering incense at Thiên Trường Temple, outdoor music and opening of the Film Festival.
- November 22: Seminar on Vietnamese films, visit Bảo Lộc Temple and Phổ Minh Pagoda, interact with garment workers of Sông Hồng Company, interact with Nam Định audiences.
- November 23: Visit the memorial house of the late General Secretary Trường Chinh, meet the people of Xuân Trường district, meet Nam Định students, interact with the people of Vụ Bản district, attend the Mẫu temple festival.
- November 24: Visit Đinh - Lê temple relic, visit Nam Định city, closing ceremony of the film festival.

=== Inadequacy ===
At this festival, the organizers distribute tickets to each agency and organization. This leads to the situation when the movie is shown, in one place the audience is all soldiers, in other places it is all workers or students. Thus, if there are lucky movies, they will find their right audience, and if there are unlucky movies, they will have to suffer from the wrong audience.

The film festival also received a series of criticisms about the organization, the lack of respect for the artists, the inadequacy in the judging criteria.

According to the information that the press present in Nam Định received before the closing ceremony, most of the members of the Jury gave their votes to "Mùa len trâu". The belief that "Mùa len trâu" won the award was further strengthened when director Nguyễn Võ Nghiêm Minh won the Best Director award. The result of the Golden Lotus given to "Hà Nội, Hà Nội" surprised everyone present in the final night, apart from the judges. Before that, "Hà Nội, Hà Nội" was never on the list of strong candidates.

== Official Selection ==
=== Feature film ===
Original title	English title	Director(s)	Production
2 trong 1	2 in 1	Đào Duy Phúc	Galaxy Studio
Áo lụa Hà Đông	The White Silk Dress	Lưu Huỳnh	Phước Sang Film
Chiến dịch trái tim bên phải	Right Heart Campaign	Đào Duy Phúc	VFS
Chớp mắt cùng số phận		Lê Ngọc Linh	Feature Film Studio I
Chuông reo là bắn		Trương Dũng	Giải Phóng Film
Chuyện của Pao	Story of Pao	Ngô Quang Hải	Feature Film Studio I
Cú đấm	The Fist	Phạm Ngọc Châu	Giải Phóng Film
Dòng máu anh hùng	The Rebel	Charlie Nguyễn	Chánh Phương Film
Đẻ mướn	Giving Hired Birth	Lê Bảo Trung	Phước Sang Film
Đường thư	Letter Way	Bùi Tuấn Dũng	VFS
Giá mua một thượng đế		Hồ Ngọc Xum	Giải Phóng Film
Giải phóng Sài Gòn	Liberation of Saigon	Long Vân	VFS, Giải Phóng Film
Gió thiên đường	Black Forest	Lâm Lê Dũng	Giải Phóng Film
Hà Nội, Hà Nội	Hanoi, Hanoi	Bùi Tuấn Dũng, Li Wei	Vivafilm, Yunnan Film Studio
Khi nắng thu về	When Autumn Sunlight Comes	Bùi Trung Hải	VFS
Mùa len trâu	The Buffalo Boy	Nguyễn Võ Nghiêm Minh	Giải Phóng Film, 3B Productions, Novak Prod.
Năm ngày trong đời vị tướng	Five Days in Life of the General	Bùi Cường	VFS
Nữ tướng cướp	Gangsta Girls	Lê Hoàng	Galaxy Studio
Sài Gòn nhật thực	Saigon Eclipse	Othello Khánh	Feature Film Studio I
Sinh mệnh	Being	Đào Duy Phúc	Feature Film Studio I
Sống trong sợ hãi	Living in Fear	Bùi Thạc Chuyên	Feature Film Studio I
Thập tự hoa	Evergreen	Vương Quang Hùng, Lý Khắc Linh	A Chau Co., Ltd
Tiếng cồng định mệnh		Lê Thi, Nguyễn Khắc Lợi	People's Army Cinema
Võ lâm truyền kỳ		Lê Bảo Trung	Phước Sang Film
Vũ điệu tử thần	Dance of Death	Bùi Tuấn Dũng	VFS

Highlighted title indicates Golden Lotus winner.

== Awards ==
=== Feature film ===
Award		Winner
Film	Golden Lotus	Hanoi, Hanoi
Film	Silver Lotus	The Rebel; The Buffalo Boy; Story of Pao
Film	Jury's Merit	Living in Fear; The White Silk Dress; Dance of Death
Film	Audience Choice	Hanoi, Hanoi
Best Director		Nguyễn Võ Nghiêm Minh – The Buffalo Boy
Best Actor		Quốc Khánh – The White Silk Dress
Best Actress		Đỗ Thị Hải Yến – Story of Pao; Ngô Thanh Vân – The Rebel
Best Supporting Actor		Hoàng Hải – Hanoi, Hanoi
Best Supporting Actress		Hạnh Thúy – Living in Fear
Best Screenplay		Lê Ngọc Minh, Gao Xufan – Hanoi, Hanoi
Best Cinematography		Dominic Pereira – The Rebel; Lý Thái Dũng – Dance of Death
Best Art Design		Lã Quý Tùng – The Rebel
Best Original Score		Christopher Wong – The Rebel; Nguyễn Thiện Đạo – Story of Pao

==== Direct-to-video ====
Award		Winner
Film	Golden Lotus	not awarded
Film	Silver Lotus	not awarded
Film	Jury's Merit	Vị giáo sư tinh tướng Những chiếc lá thời gian
Best Director		not awarded
Best Actor		Nguyễn Văn Bình – Đêm vùng biên
Best Actress		not awarded
Best Supporting Actor		Mạnh Trường – Mùa thu không cô đơn
Best Supporting Actress		Nguyễn Thu Hà – Mùa thu không cô đơn
Best Cinematography		Trịnh Quang Tùng – Đêm vùng biên
Best Art Design		Dân Nam – Mùa hạ không quên
Best Original Score		Bảo Phúc – Những chiếc lá thời gian

=== Documentary/Science film ===
==== Documentary film ====
Award		Winner
Film	Golden Lotus	not awarded
Film	Silver Lotus	Họ hy sinh vì Tổ quốc Những nẻo đường công lý Còn lại với thời gian
Film	Jury's Merit	Không chỉ là thương hiệu Lửa thiêng Bài ca trên đỉnh Tà Lùng; Ký ức người con gái
Best Director		Đào Trọng Khánh – Lửa thiêng
Best Screenplay		Đào Thanh Tùng – Làng đàn ông
Best Cinematography		Hoàng Ngọc Dũng – Bài ca trên đỉnh Tà Lùng

==== Science film ====
Award		Winner
Film	Golden Lotus	Sự sống ở rừng Cúc Phương
Film	Silver Lotus	Tìm lại dấu vết một kinh thành
Film	Jury's Merit	Mỹ Sơn, miền di sản Hành trình gen
Best Director		Nguyễn Văn Hướng – Sự sống ở rừng Cúc Phương
Best Cinematography		Lê Quốc Hùng – Sự sống ở rừng Cúc Phương

=== Animated film ===
Award		Winner
Film	Golden Lotus	not awarded
Film	Silver Lotus	Ếch chia trăng Giấc mơ của Ếch Xanh
Film	Jury's Merit	Chuyến đi xa của Tắc Kè; Chú Đốm trong thành phố
Best Director		not awarded
Best Screenplay		Phong Thu – Ếch chia trăng
Best Animator		Phùng Văn Hà – Giấc mơ bong bóng Phạm Ngọc Tuấn – Chú gà đất
Best Original Score		Nguyễn Như Thắng – Giấc mơ của Ếch Xanh
