= Big Father, Small Father and Other Stories =

2015 Vietnamese drama film

- Directed by: Phan Đăng Di
- Written by: Phan Đăng Di
- Produced by: Paolo Bertolin; Do Thi Hai Yen; Markus Halberschmidt; Fleur Knopperts; Calvin T. Lam; Le Hang Lizeroux Nguyen; Nguyễn Hoàng Điệp; Phan Đăng Di; Denis Vaslin
- Starring: Do Thi Hai Yen
- Cinematography: Nguyễn K’Linh
- Edited by: Julie Béziau
- Music by: Chapelier Fou
- Production companies: DNY Viet Nam Productions; Acrobates Film; Busse & Halberschmidt; Volya Films; World Cinema Fund; Film- und Medienstiftung NRW; L'Aide aux Cinémas du Monde; La Région Île-de-France; Fonds Francophone de Production Audiovisuelle du Sud; Nederlands Filmfonds; Hubert Bals Fund
- Distributed by: Memento Films
- Release dates: 13 February 2015 (Berlin); 1 December 2015 (Vietnam)
- Running time: 100 minutes
- Countries: Vietnam; Netherlands; Germany; France
- Language: Vietnamese

Big Father, Small Father and Other Stories (Vietnamese: Cha và con và...) is a 2015 Vietnamese drama film directed by Phan Đăng Di.

It was screened in the main competition section of the 65th Berlin International Film Festival in 2015.

== Cast ==
- Lê Công Hoàng as Vu
- Đỗ Thị Hải Yến as Van
- Trương Thế Vinh as Thang
