= Barbara Zecchi =

Feminist film scholar

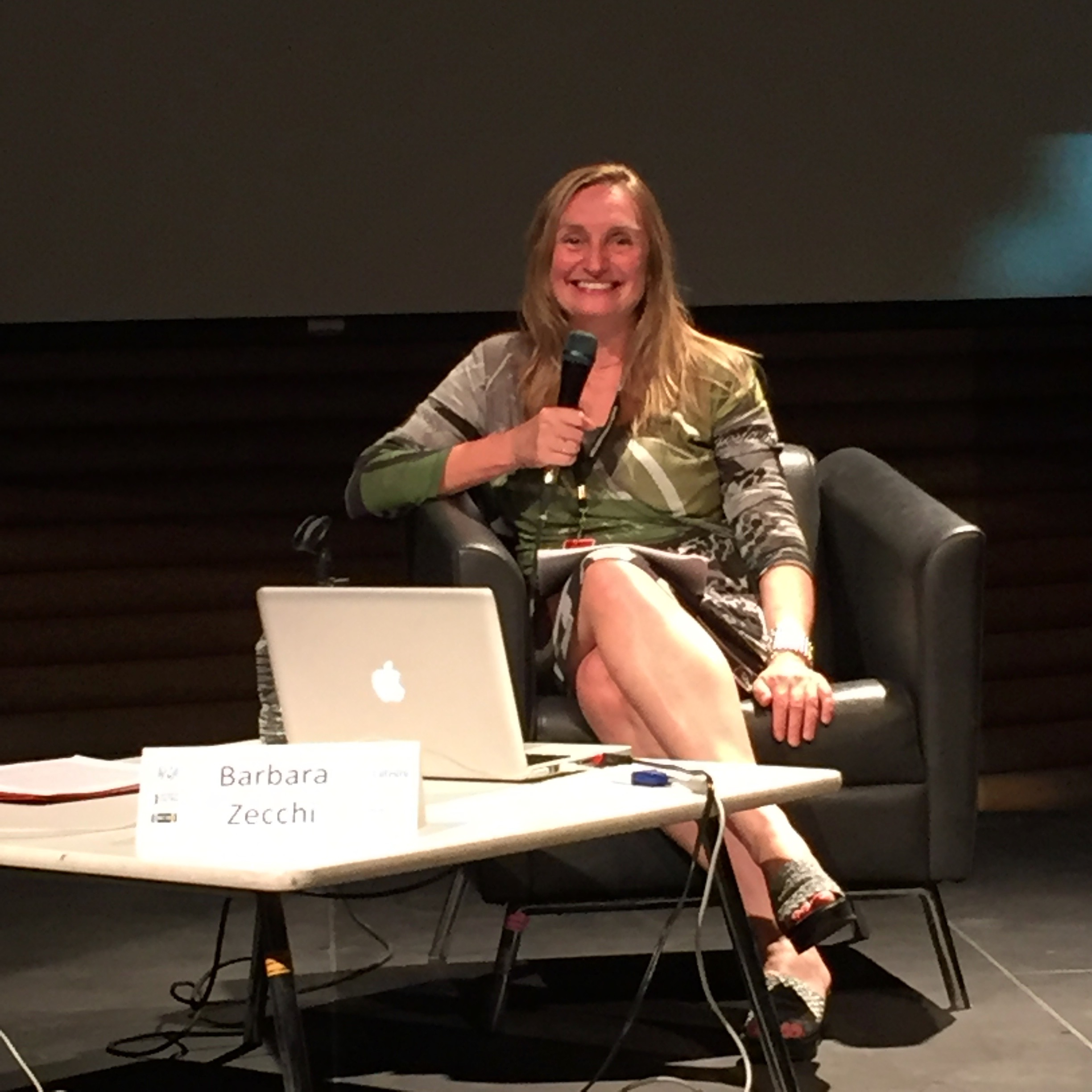
- Born: London, United Kingdom

Academic background
- Education: Ca' Foscari University of Venice (BA); University of California, San Diego (MA); University of California, Los Angeles (MA, PhD)
- Thesis: The Representation of Rape and the Rape of Representation: Sexual/Textual Violence in Spain and Italy (1998)

Academic work
- Discipline: Film studies
- Sub-discipline: Feminist film theory
- Institutions: University of Massachusetts Amherst

Barbara Zecchi is an Italian feminist film scholar, film critic, videoessayist, and film festival curator. She is professor of Film Studies and director of the Interdepartmental Program in Film Studies at the University of Massachusetts Amherst.

== Biography ==
Born in London, United Kingdom, to Italian parents, she grew up in Venice, Italy, and graduated with honors in modern languages and cultures at Ca' Foscari University of Venice. She received a master's degree in literary studies, specializing in Hispanic studies and gender studies, from the University of California, San Diego (UCSD), and a second master's degree in Italian studies and film studies from the University of California, Los Angeles (UCLA). She completed her PhD at UCLA with a thesis on the representation of gender-based violence in Spain and Italy. More recently she studied screenwriting at the Escuela de Guion in Madrid with Alicia Luna, and video-graphic criticism at Middlebury College with Jason Mittell and Chris Keathley.

=== Career ===
Zecchi is Professor of Film Studies in the area of Visual and Performance Studies and Director of the Film Studies Program at the University of Massachusetts Amherst. She specializes in feminist film theory, adaptation theory, gender studies and cultural gerontology, video-graphic criticism, and digital humanities. From to 2011-15, she served as graduate program director and Head of the Spanish and Portuguese Unit of the Dept. of Languages, Literatures and Cultures. From 2014-16, she directed the UMass Translation Center.

She taught at various European and American universities, including Saint Mary's College of California, California State University, Johns Hopkins University, Universidad Carlos III in Madrid, and in the Master programs of the Universitat de Valencia and the Universitat de Girona. She has lectured and presented her video-graphic essays in Italy, Spain, Portugal, England, Cuba, Dominican Republic, Mexico, Canada and the United States. In 2016, she was elected associate member of the Spanish Film Academy (Academia de las Artes y las Ciencias Cinematográficas de España).

== Publications ==
In her publications, Zecchi develops an analysis of women film production. In Desenfocadas/Out of focus she follows the struggle of different generations of women filmmakers trying to find a space in the male-dominated world of cinema vis-à-vis the evolution of their historical context and of the feminist movement. The ultimate goal of this study is to demonstrate that despite the obvious changes, women are still subjected to traditional values without any real alternative to patriarchal stereotypes in dominant cinema, but at the same time, these stereotypes are deconstructed by each generation of women directors, in each historical period. For Esther Gimeno Ugalde,

Barbara Zecchi's book has the merit of adding a historical dimension to the phenomenon by tracing the presence of female directors from the origins of Spanish cinema to the present day. The analytical depth and erudition displayed in Desenfocadas makes it an indispensable reference, as much for those who are interested in the history of Spanish cinema as for those interested in feminist film theory.

La pantalla sexuada/The Gendered Screen focuses on five topics that are central to feminist film theory (i.e., space, authorship, pleasure, body and violence) in an attempt to reveal the gendered dynamics that have been used in movies to expropriate the feminine and with the goal of studying the gradual process of re-appropriation of a space, a gaze and an agency.

She is the founder and director of the Gynocine Project, a Digital Humanities open source project launched with a seed grant of the University of Massachusetts in 2011, with the aim of increasing the visibility of women's cinema. The term of her coinage "gynocine" is an alternative to the limiting labels that have dominated the discussions on women-directed cinema. According to Pérez Villanueva, Zecchi understands "gynocine" as a "theoretical and practical tool that allows for a feminist reading of any film regardless of the gender of the author".

Zecchi is vice-director of the international multidisciplinary network cinemAGEgender based in Birmingham, England, which studies the intersection of cultural gerontology with gender studies and film studies.

In 2020, her book Desenfocadas (Out of focus) was selected by the Spanish daily national newspaper El Diario as one of the “13 books that have defined the decade".

=== Selected publications ===
- Sexualidad y escritura (1850–2000) (co-edited with Raquel Medina). Barcelona: Anthropos, 2002; ISBN 9788476586372
- La mujer en la España actual ¿Evolución o involución? (co-edited Jacqueline Cruz). Barcelona: Icaria, 2004; ISBN 9788474267051
- Teoría y práctica de la adaptación fílmica. Madrid: Editorial Complutense, 2011; ISBN 9788499381305
- Gynocine: Teoría de género, filmología y praxis cinematográfica Zaragoza: Publicaciones Universidad Zaragoza, 2013; ISBN 9788416935055
- Desenfocadas: cineastas españolas y discursos de género, Barcelona: Editorial Icaria, 2014; ISBN 9788498885682
- La pantalla sexuada, Madrid: Editorial Cátedra, 2015; ISBN 978-84-376-3316-9
- Tras las lentes de Isabel Coixet: género y cine. Zaragoza: Publicaciones Universidad de Zaragoza, Colección Vidas (PUZ), 2017; ISBN 9788498885682
- Gender-Based Violence in Latin American and Iberian Cinemas, (co-edited with Rebeca Maseda and María José Gámez Fuentes), Routledge, London and New York, 2020; ISBN 9781138349476

== Film festivals ==
Zecchi has been involved with national and international film festivals in different capacities. She was a member of the Official Jury of the Film Festival Cines del Sur in Granada, Spain, in 2014, and a member of the Flecos Awards Jury in 2017.

In 2018, she collaborated with Cines del Sur as a film critic and wrote daily film reviews for Caimán Cuadernos de Cine Journal. She participated at MICGénero Film Festival in Mexico in 2016 as a member of the Gender Lab Jury, and in 2018 with Ruby Rich she conducted a workshop on Feminism and Queer Theory. She collaborates with the Massachusetts Multicultural Film Festival, the UMass Latin American Film Festival, and she is the founder and co-curator of the Massachusetts Catalan Film Festival.
