= 7th Golden Satellite Awards =

Awards honoring film and television in 2002

- Date: January 12, 2003

Highlights
- Best drama film: Far from Heaven
- Best comedy/musical film: My Big Fat Greek Wedding
- Best television drama: CSI: Crime Scene Investigation
- Best television musical/comedy: The Bernie Mac Show
- Best director: Todd Haynes for Far from Heaven

The 7th Golden Satellite Awards, honoring the best in film and television of 2002, were presented by the International Press Academy on January 12, 2003.

== Special achievement awards ==
Mary Pickford Award (for outstanding contribution to the entertainment industry) – Robert Evans

Nikola Tesla Award (for a lifetime of visionary filmmaking achievement) – George Lucas

Outstanding New Talent – Derek Luke

Outstanding Service in the Entertainment Industry – Murray Weissman and Dick Delson (Weissman Delson Communications)

== Motion picture winners and nominees ==
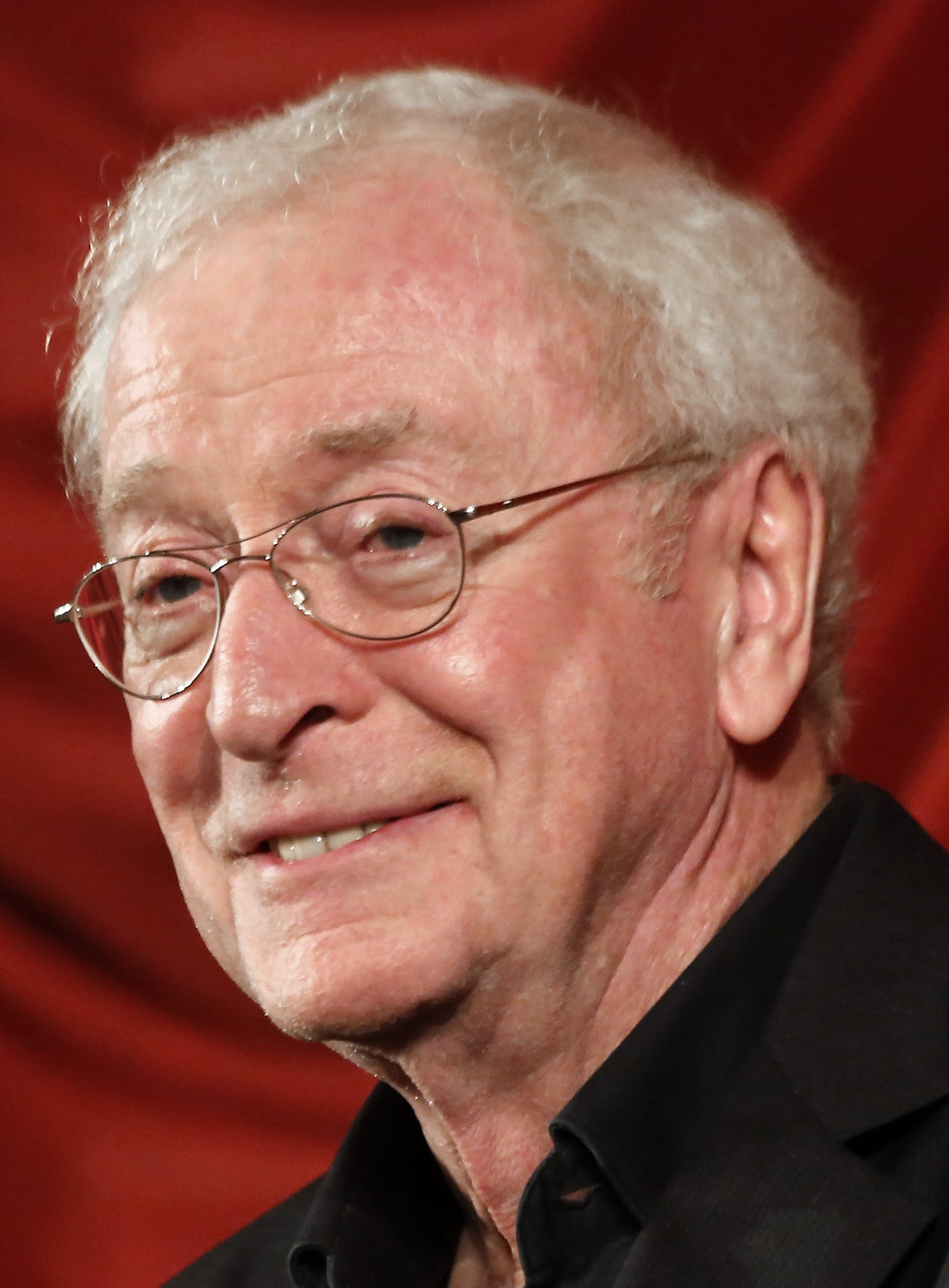
Michael Caine – Best Actor in a Motion Picture, Drama

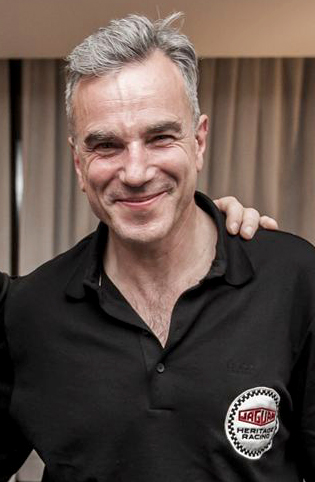
Daniel Day-Lewis – Best Actor in a Motion Picture, Drama

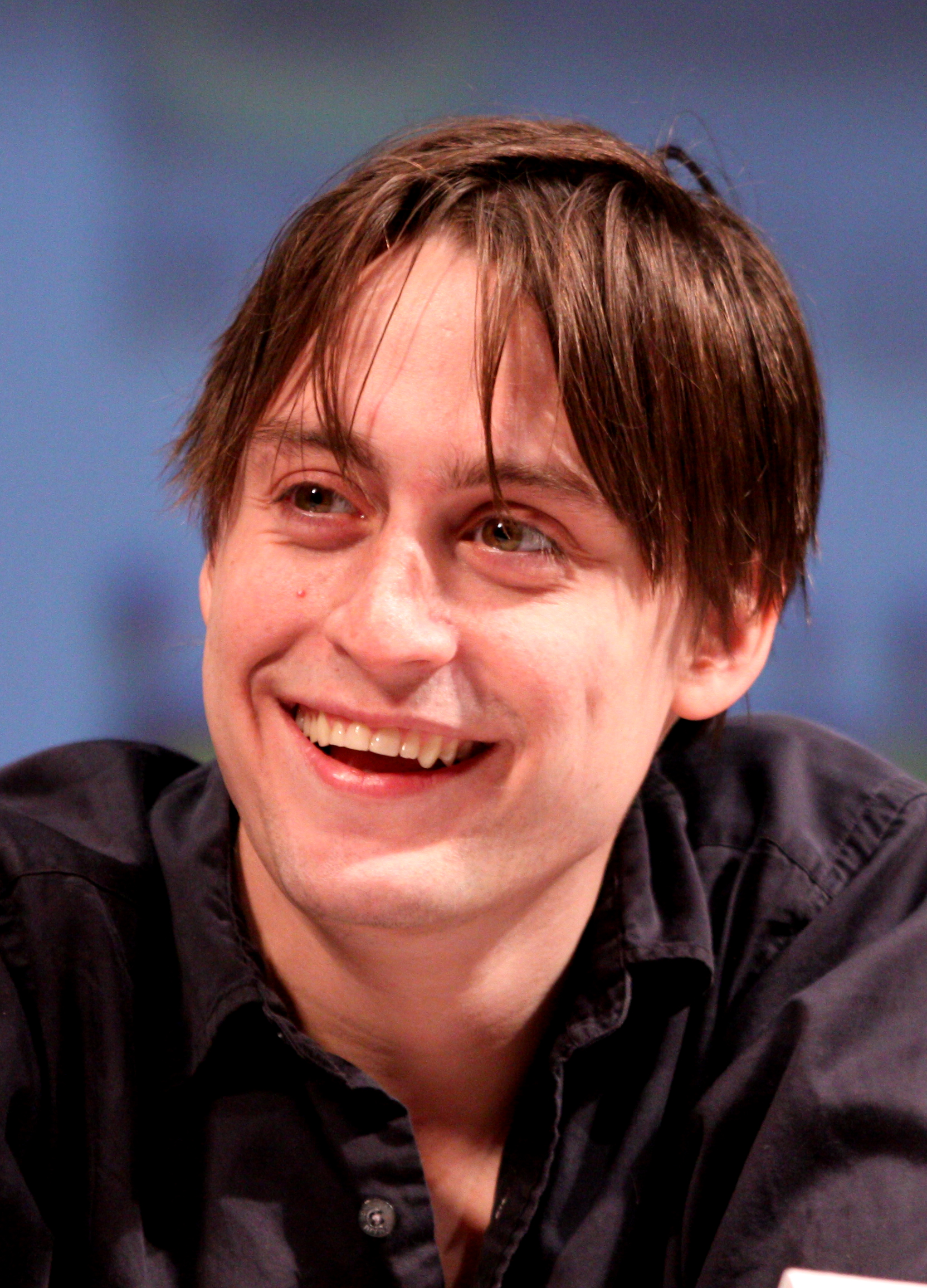
Kieran Culkin – Best Actor in a Motion Picture, Comedy or Musical

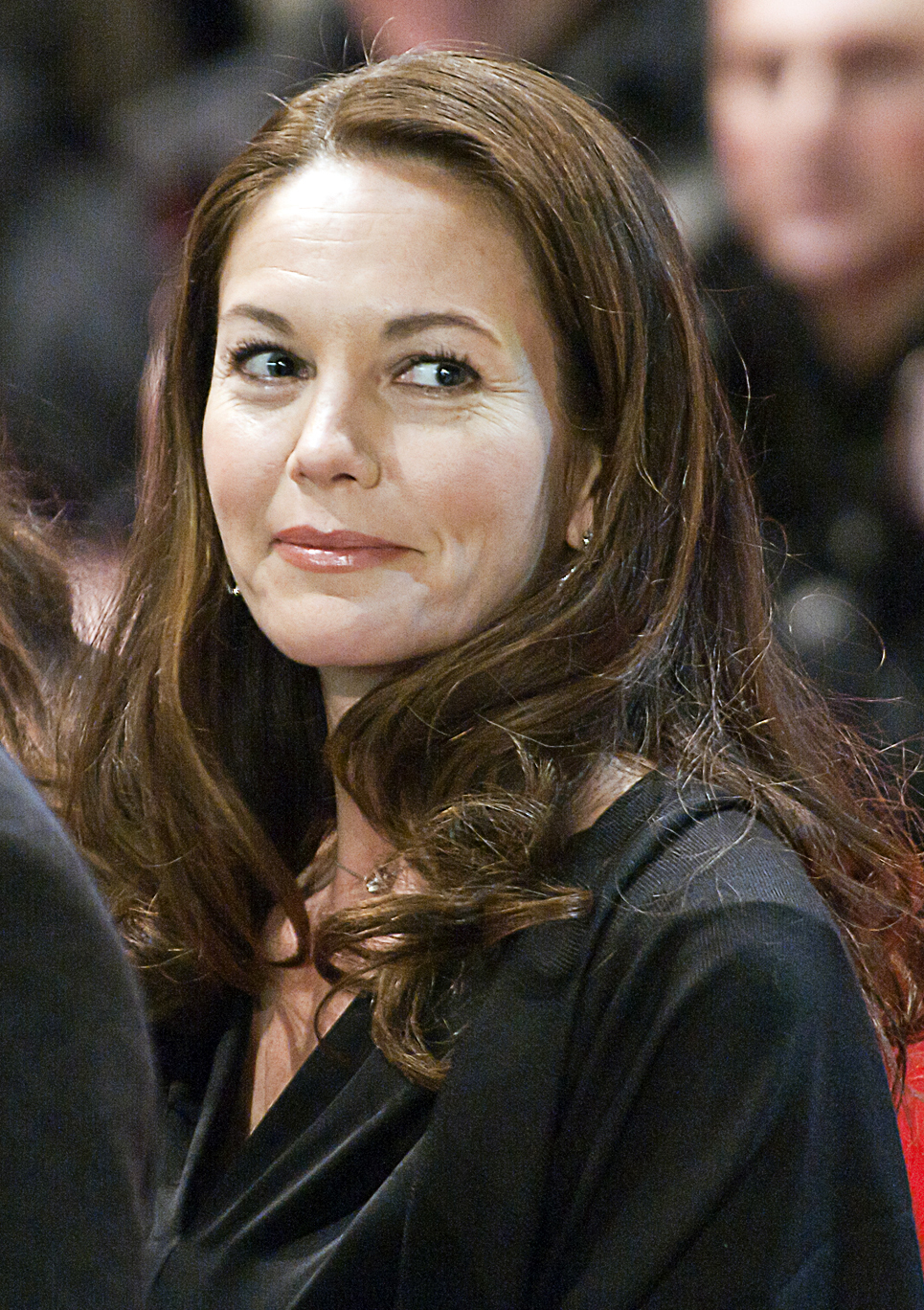
Diane Lane – Best Actress in a Motion Picture, Drama

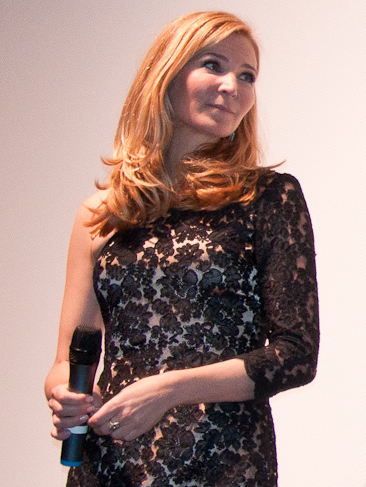
Jennifer Westfeldt – Best Actress in a Motion Picture, Comedy or Musical

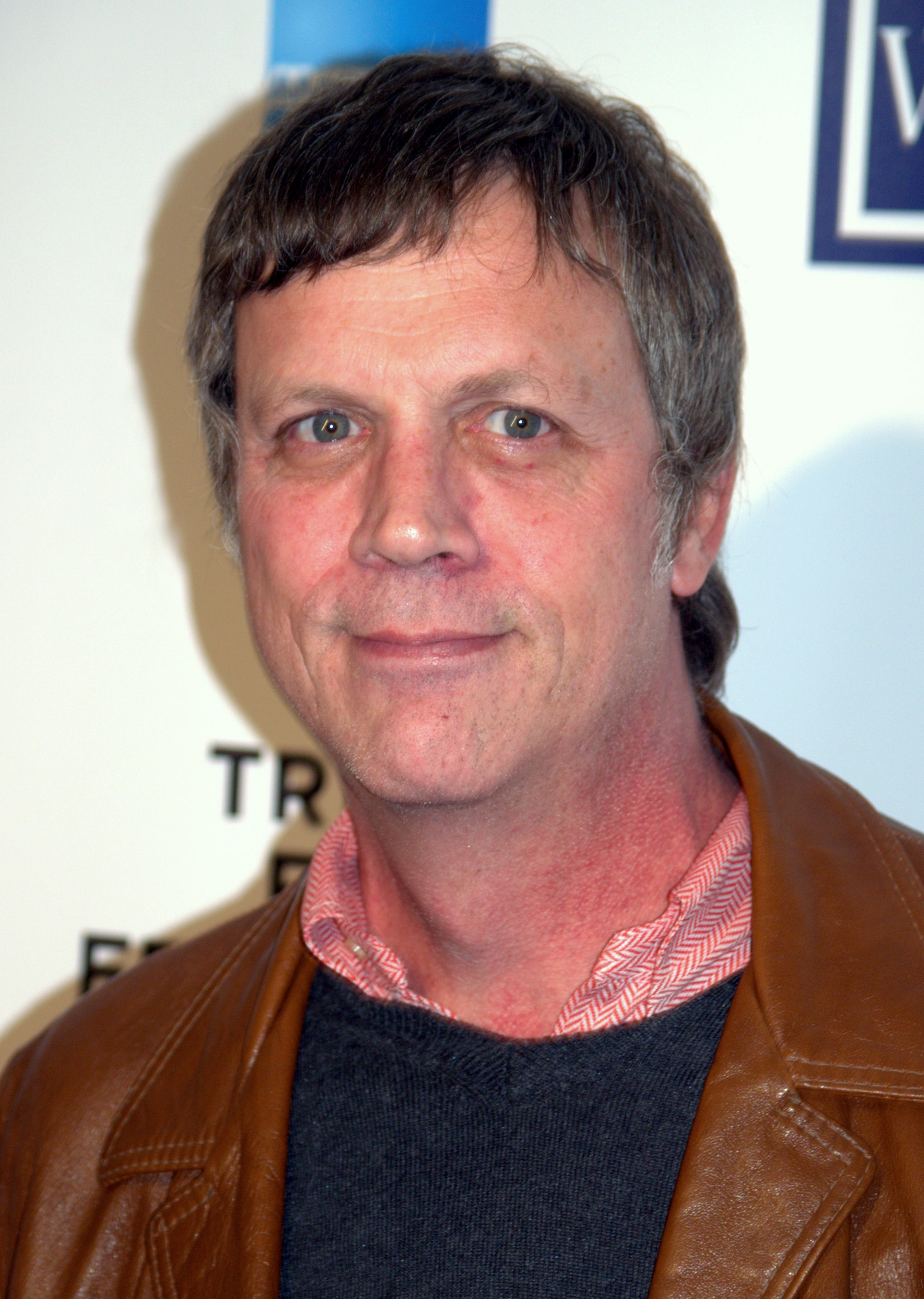
Todd Haynes – Best Director

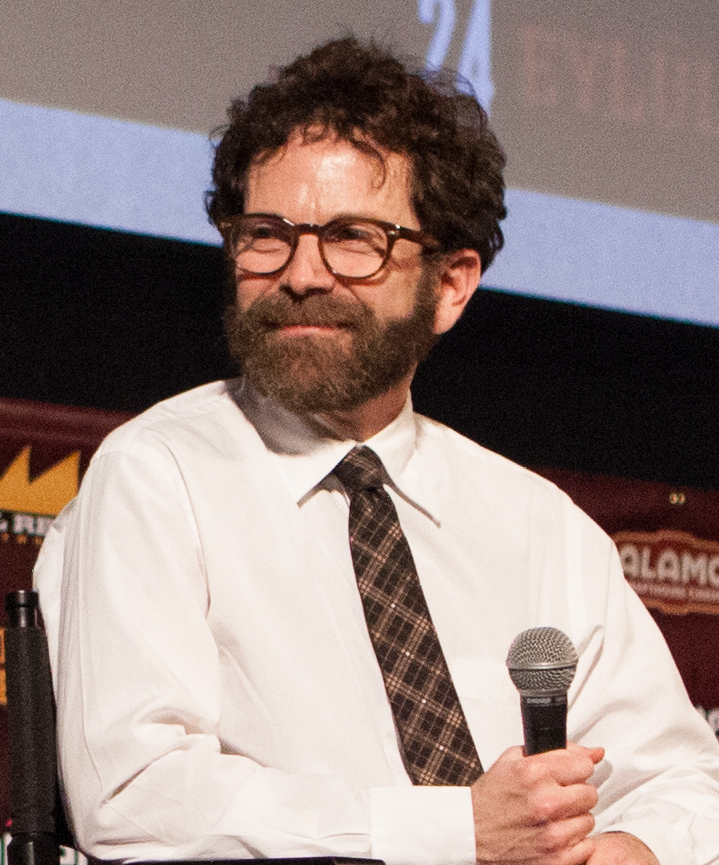
Charlie Kaufman – Best Adapted Screenplay

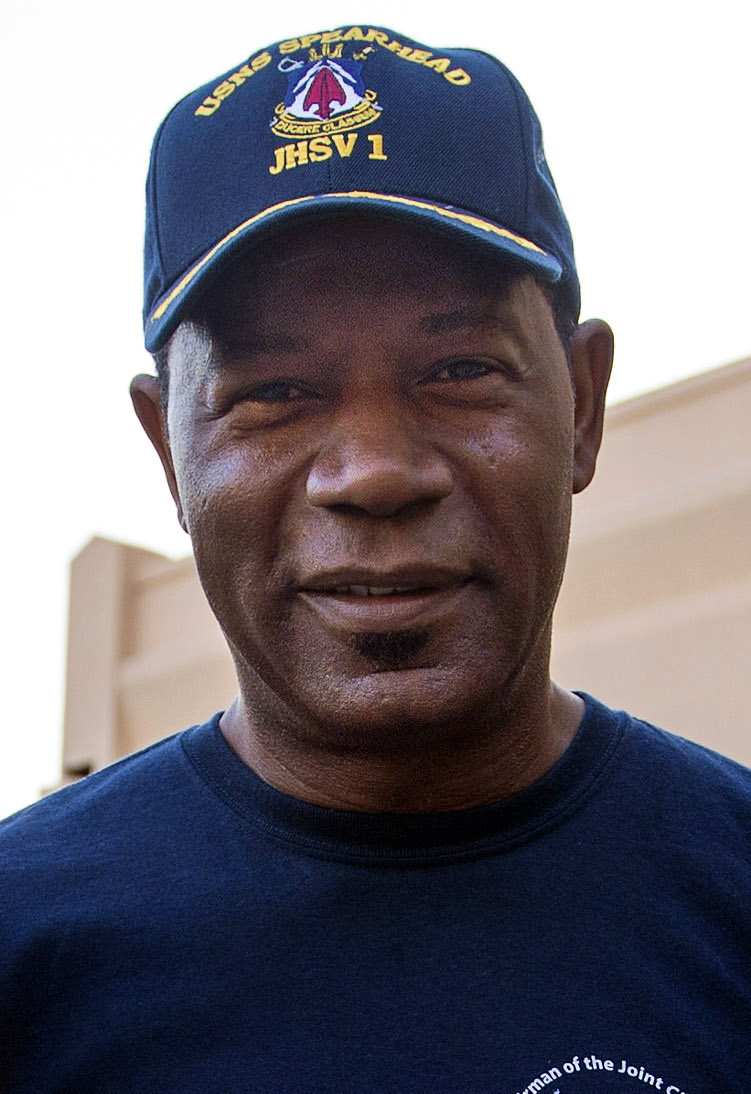
Dennis Haysbert – Best Supporting Actor in a Motion Picture, Drama

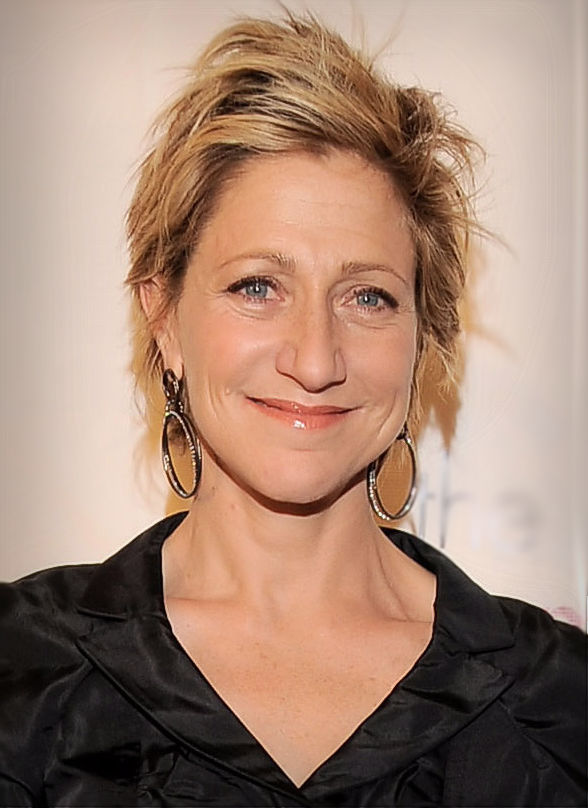
Edie Falco – Best Supporting Actress in a Motion Picture, Drama

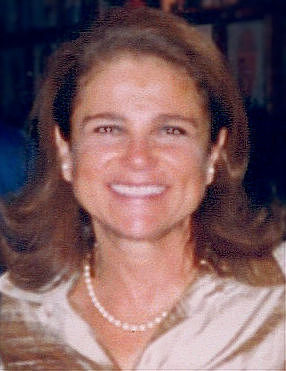
Tovah Feldshuh – Best Supporting Actress in a Motion Picture, Comedy or Musical

=== Best Actor – Drama ===
Michael Caine – The Quiet American (TIE)
Daniel Day-Lewis – Gangs of New York (TIE)

- Tom Hanks – Road to Perdition
- Jack Nicholson – About Schmidt
- Edward Norton – 25th Hour
- Robin Williams – One Hour Photo

=== Best Actor – Musical or Comedy ===
Kieran Culkin – Igby Goes Down

- Nicolas Cage – Adaptation.
- Hugh Grant – About a Boy
- Sam Rockwell – Confessions of a Dangerous Mind
- Adam Sandler – Punch-Drunk Love
- Aaron Stanford – Tadpole

=== Best Actress – Drama ===
Diane Lane – Unfaithful

- Salma Hayek – Frida
- Nicole Kidman – The Hours
- Julianne Moore – Far from Heaven
- Meryl Streep – The Hours
- Sigourney Weaver – The Guys

=== Best Actress – Musical or Comedy ===
Jennifer Westfeldt – Kissing Jessica Stein

- Jennifer Aniston – The Good Girl
- Maggie Gyllenhaal – Secretary
- Catherine Keener – Lovely & Amazing
- Nia Vardalos – My Big Fat Greek Wedding
- Renée Zellweger – Chicago

=== Best Animated or Mixed Media Film ===
Spirited Away (Sen to Chihiro no kamikakushi)

- Ice Age
- Lilo & Stitch
- Spirit: Stallion of the Cimarron
- The Wild Thornberrys Movie

=== Best Art Direction ===
Gangs of New York – Dante Ferretti

- Catch Me If You Can
- CQ
- Frida
- Road to Perdition

=== Best Cinematography ===
Road to Perdition – Conrad L. Hall

- Far from Heaven
- Gangs of New York
- The Lord of the Rings: The Two Towers
- Minority Report

=== Best Costume Design ===
Frida – Julie Weiss

- Austin Powers in Goldmember
- Gangs of New York
- Road to Perdition
- Star Wars: Episode II – Attack of the Clones

=== Best Director ===
Todd Haynes – Far from Heaven

- Pedro Almodóvar – Talk to Her (Hable con ella)
- Stephen Daldry – The Hours
- Peter Jackson – The Lord of the Rings: The Two Towers
- Phillip Noyce – The Quiet American
- Denzel Washington – Antwone Fisher

=== Best Documentary Film ===
The Kid Stays in the Picture

- Biggie and Tupac
- Bowling for Columbine
- The Cockettes
- Dogtown and Z-Boys

=== Best Editing ===
Gangs of New York – Thelma Schoonmaker

- Adaptation.
- Insomnia
- The Lord of the Rings: The Two Towers
- One Hour Photo

=== Best Film – Drama ===
Far from Heaven

- Antwone Fisher
- The Hours
- The Lord of the Rings: The Two Towers
- The Quiet American
- Road to Perdition

=== Best Film – Musical or Comedy ===
My Big Fat Greek Wedding

- About a Boy
- Adaptation.
- Igby Goes Down
- Punch-Drunk Love

=== Best Foreign Language Film ===
Talk to Her (Hable con ella), Spain

- All or Nothing, UK
- Bloody Sunday, Ireland/UK
- Everyone Loves Alice (Alla älskar Alice), Sweden
- Monsoon Wedding, India
- Rain, New Zealand
- Sex and Lucia (Lucía y el sexo), France/Spain

=== Best Original Score ===
"Frida" – Elliot Goldenthal

- "24 Hour Party People" – Liz Gallacher
- "25th Hour" – Terence Blanchard
- "About a Boy" – Damon Gough
- "Roger Dodger" – Craig Wedren

=== Best Original Song ===
"Something to Talk About" performed by Badly Drawn Boy – About a Boy

- "8 Mile" – 8 Mile
- "Die Another Day" – Die Another Day
- "Girl on the Roof" – Van Wilder
- "Love Is a Crime" – Chicago
- "Work It Out" – Austin Powers in Goldmember

=== Best Screenplay – Adapted ===
Adaptation. – Charlie and Donald Kaufman

- Chicago – Bill Condon
- The Lord of the Rings: The Two Towers – Philippa Boyens, Peter Jackson, Stephen Sinclair and Fran Walsh
- My Big Fat Greek Wedding – Nia Vardalos
- The Pianist – Ronald Harwood

=== Best Screenplay – Original ===
Talk to Her (Hable con ella) – Pedro Almodóvar

- All or Nothing – Mike Leigh
- Far from Heaven – Todd Haynes
- The Good Girl – Mike White
- Igby Goes Down – Burr Steers
- Lovely & Amazing – Nicole Holofcener

=== Best Sound ===
Solaris – Larry Blake

- Gangs of New York
- The Lord of the Rings: The Two Towers
- Minority Report
- Signs

=== Best Supporting Actor – Drama ===
Dennis Haysbert – Far from Heaven

- Jeremy Davies – Solaris
- Alfred Molina – Frida
- Viggo Mortensen – The Lord of the Rings: The Two Towers
- Paul Newman – Road to Perdition
- Dennis Quaid – Far from Heaven

=== Best Supporting Actor – Musical or Comedy ===
Michael Constantine – My Big Fat Greek Wedding

- Chris Cooper – Adaptation.
- Jake Gyllenhaal – The Good Girl
- Philip Seymour Hoffman – Punch-Drunk Love
- Nicky Katt – Full Frontal
- John C. Reilly – The Good Girl

=== Best Supporting Actress – Drama ===
Edie Falco – Sunshine State

- Kathy Bates – About Schmidt
- Julianne Moore – The Hours
- Miranda Richardson – Spider
- Do Thi Hai Yen – The Quiet American
- Renée Zellweger – White Oleander

=== Best Supporting Actress – Musical or Comedy ===
Tovah Feldshuh – Kissing Jessica Stein

- Toni Collette – About a Boy
- Lainie Kazan – My Big Fat Greek Wedding
- Emily Mortimer – Lovely & Amazing
- Bebe Neuwirth – Tadpole
- Meryl Streep – Adaptation.

=== Best Visual Effects ===
The Lord of the Rings: The Two Towers

- Gangs of New York
- Minority Report
- Road to Perdition
- Spider-Man

=== Outstanding Motion Picture Ensemble ===
The Lord of the Rings: The Two Towers

== Television winners and nominees ==
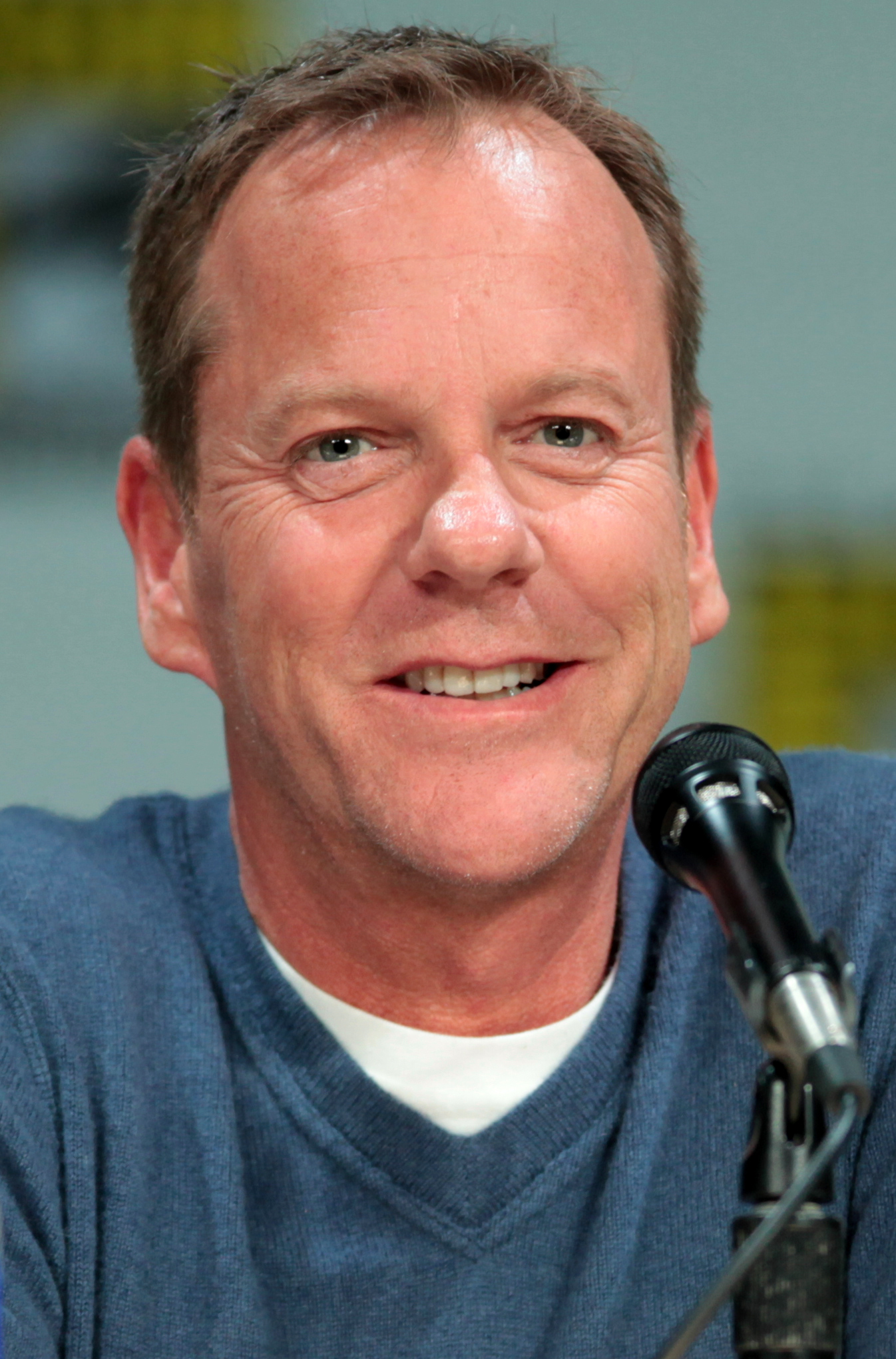
Kiefer Sutherland – Best Actor in a Series, Drama

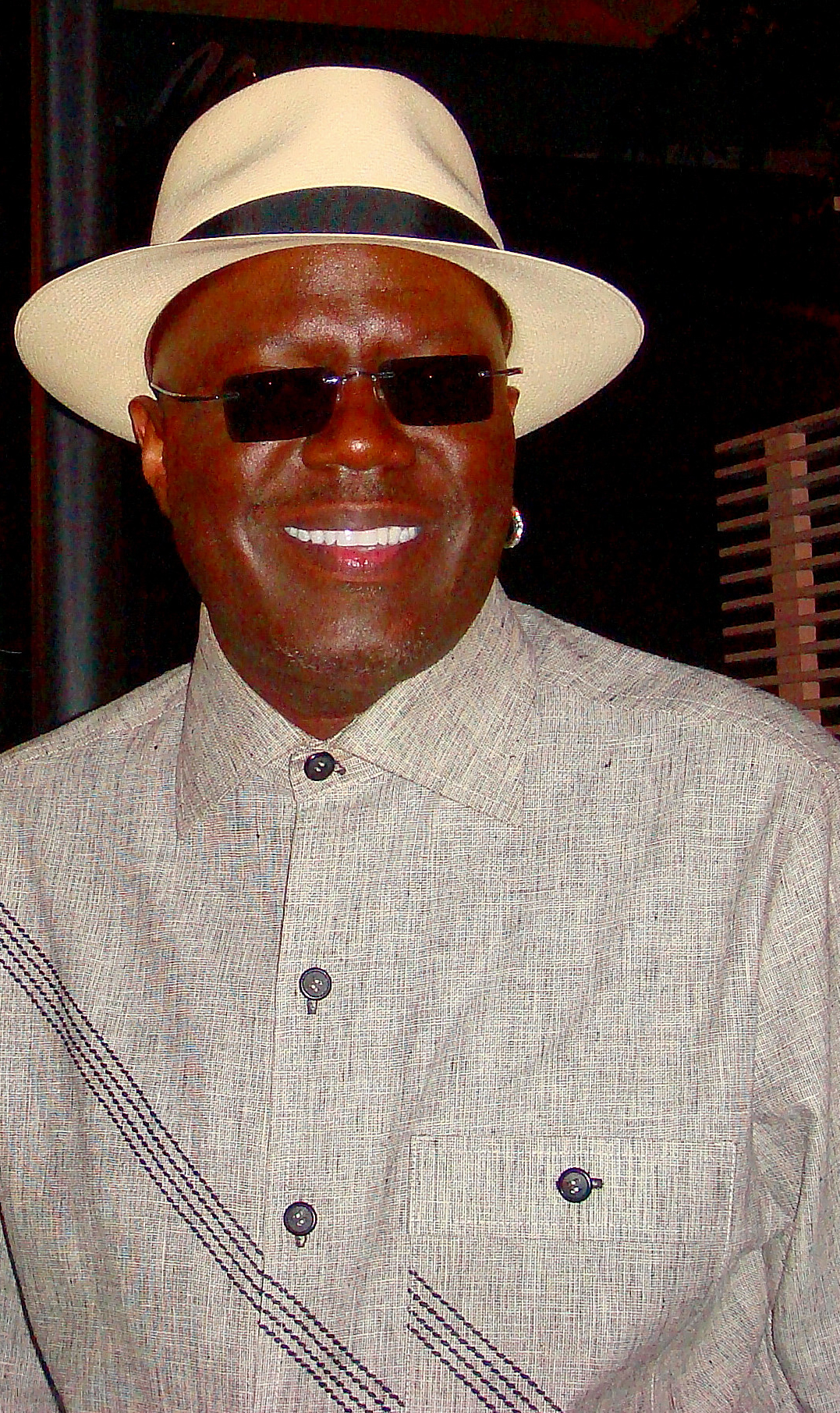
Bernie Mac – Best Actor in a Series, Comedy or Musical

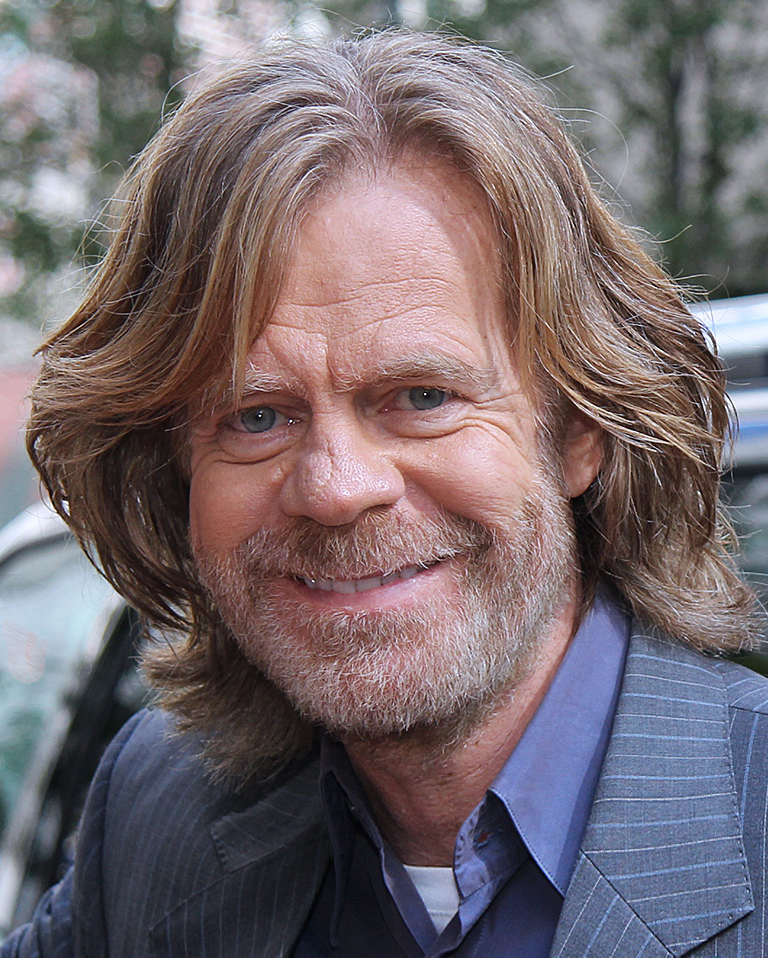
William H. Macy – Best Actor in a Miniseries or Television Film

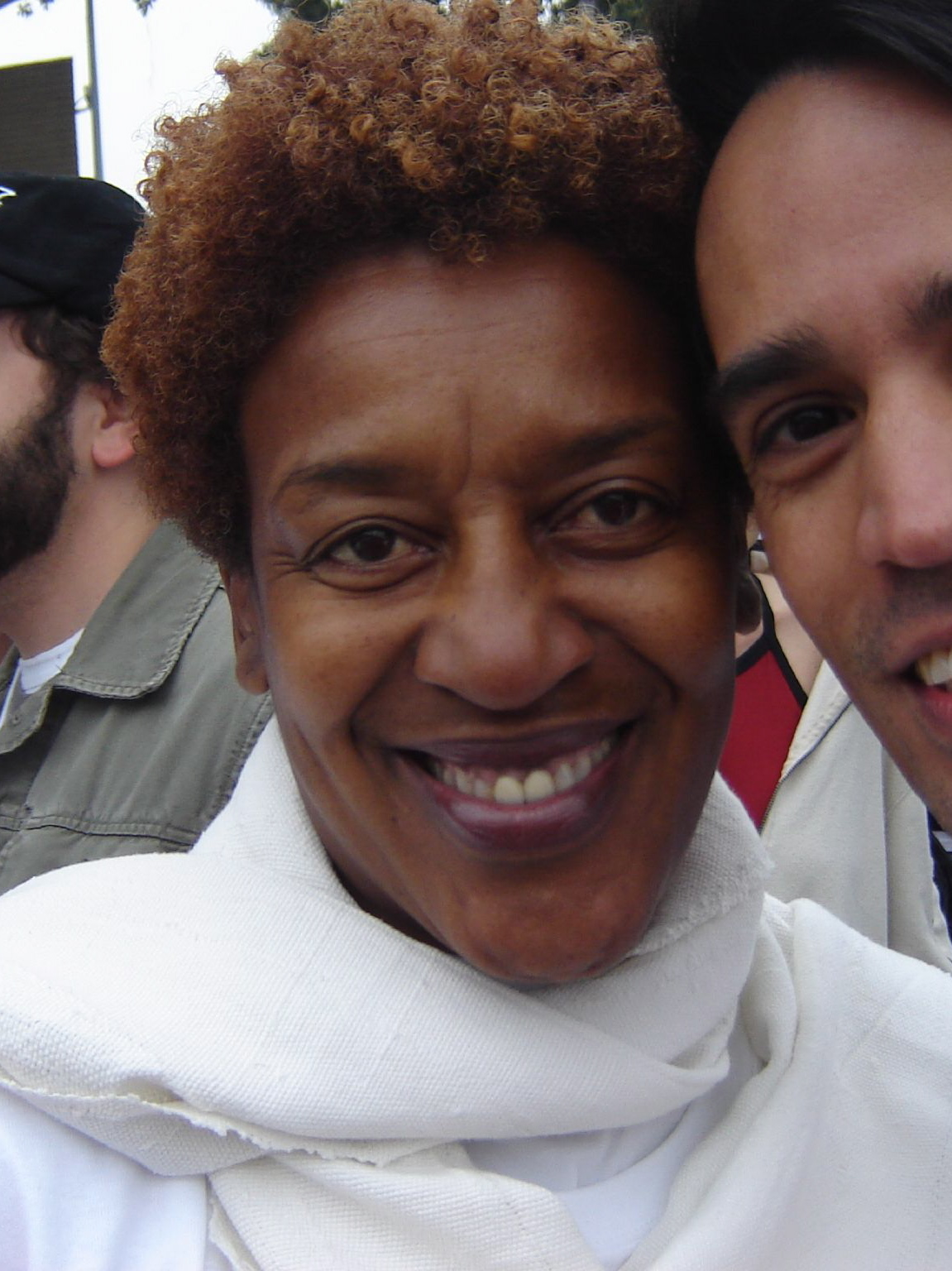
CCH Pounder – Best Actress in a Series, Drama

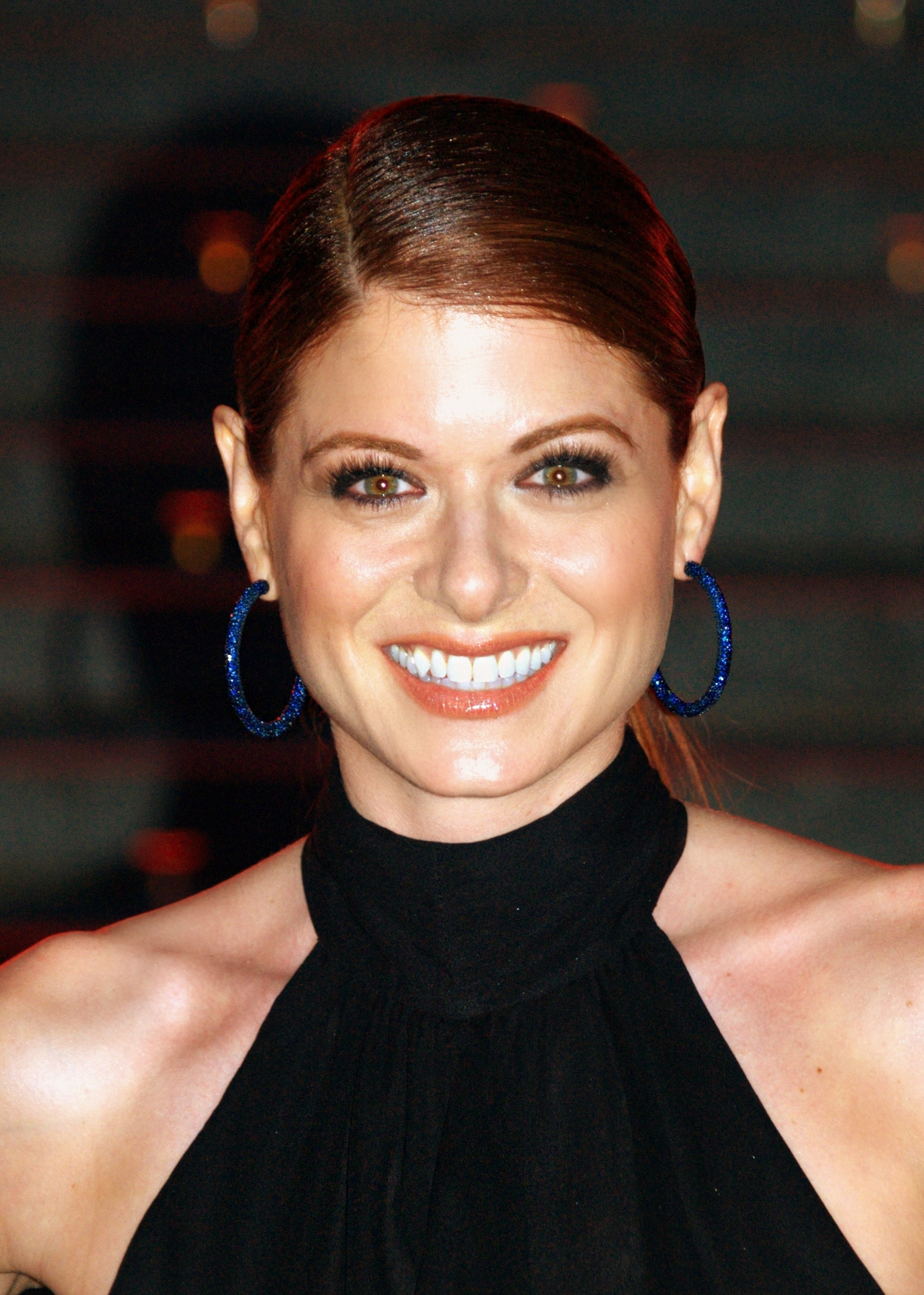
Debra Messing – Best Actress in a Series, Comedy or Musical

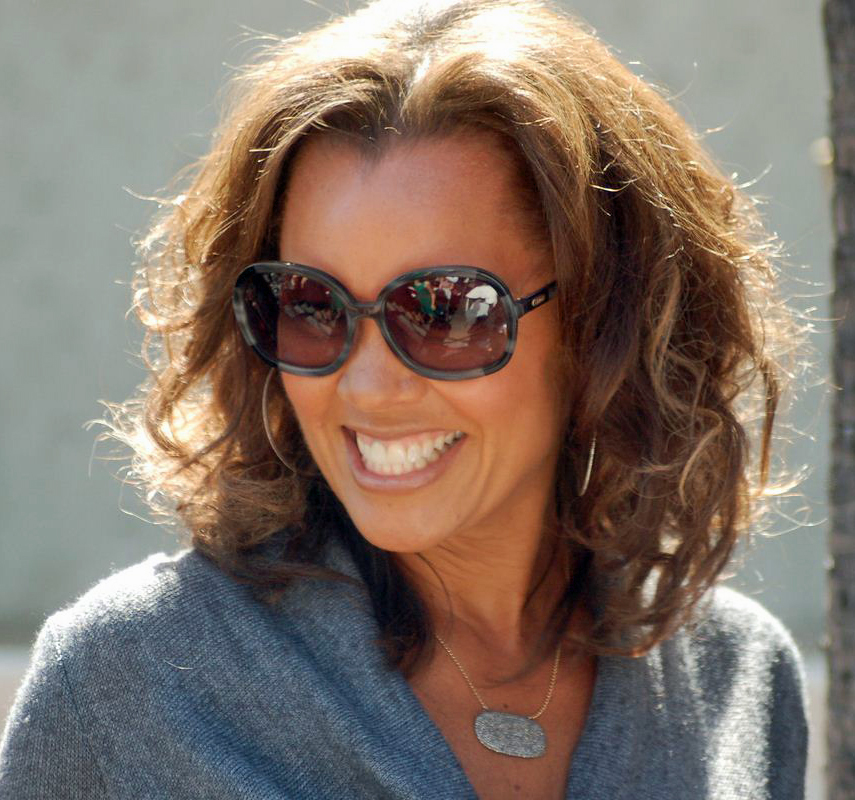
Vanessa Williams – Best Actress in a Series, Miniseries or Television Film

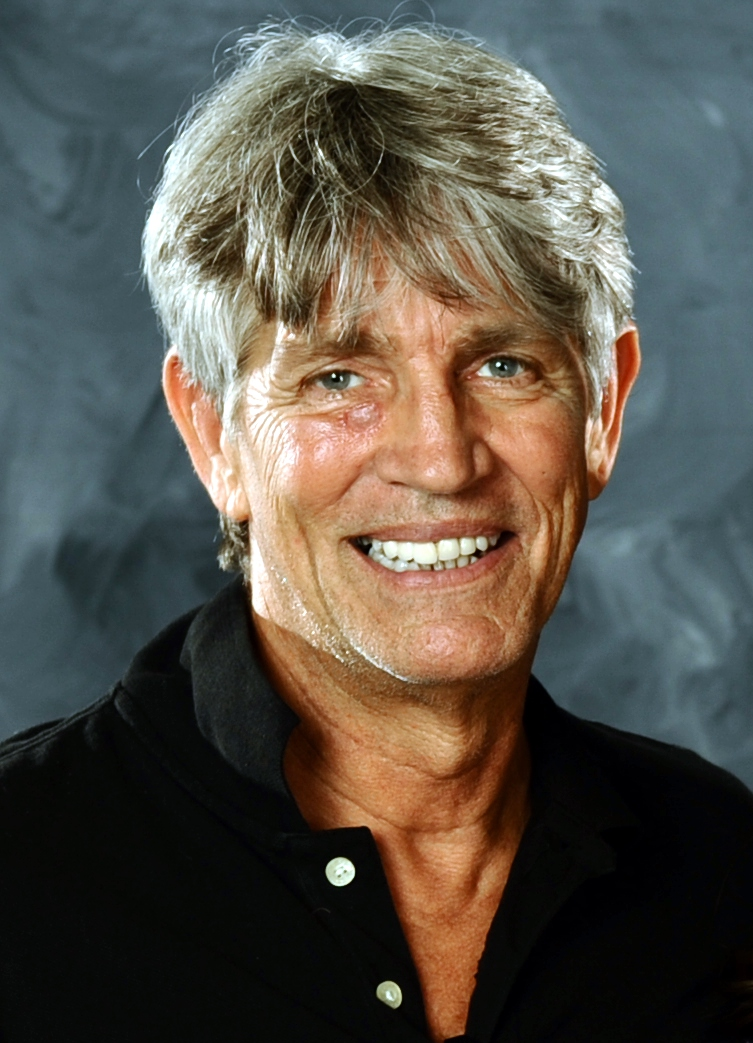
Eric Roberts – Best Actor in a Series, Comedy or Musical

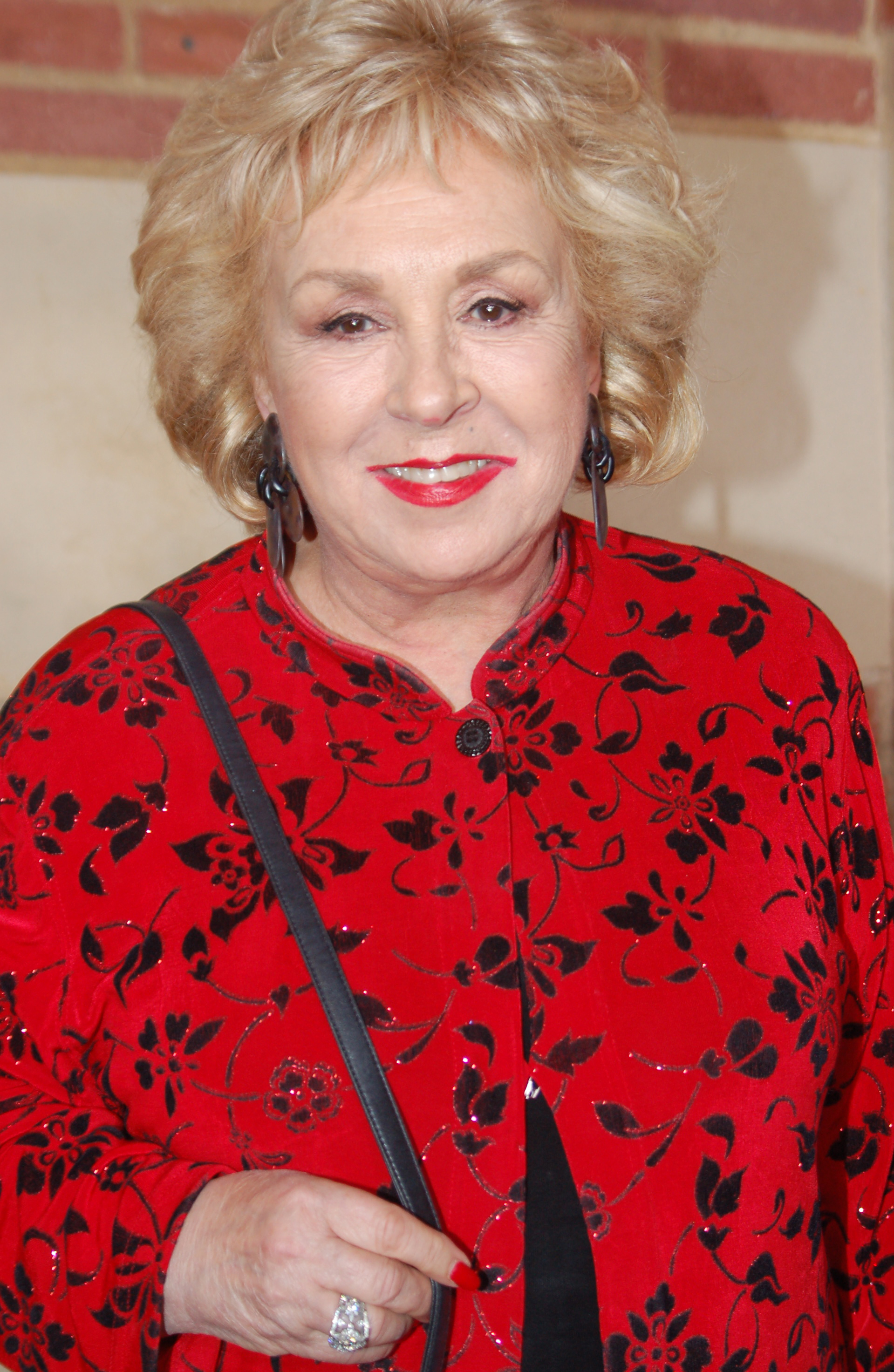
Doris Roberts – Best Supporting Actress in a Series, Comedy or Musical

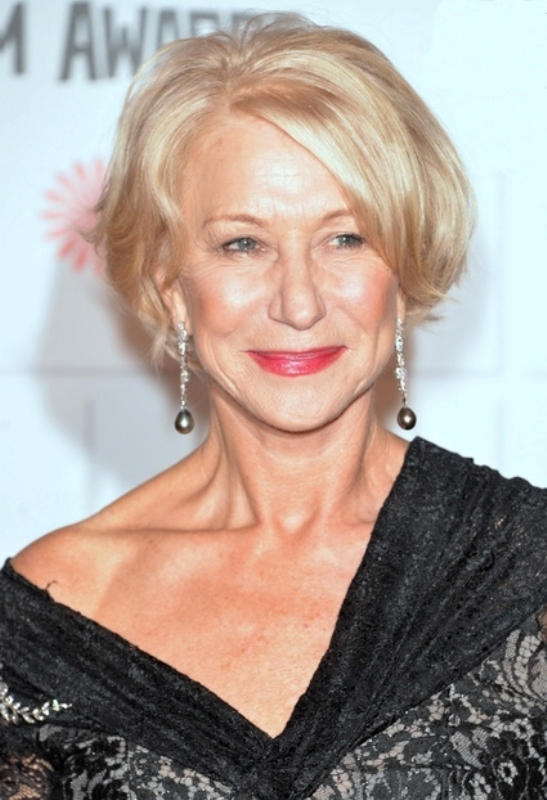
Helen Mirren – Best Supporting Actress in a Series, Miniseries or Television Film

=== Best Actor – Drama Series ===
Kiefer Sutherland – 24

- Michael Chiklis – The Shield
- Peter Krause – Six Feet Under
- Chi McBride – Boston Public
- Martin Sheen – The West Wing

=== Best Actor – Musical or Comedy Series ===
Bernie Mac – The Bernie Mac Show

- Matt LeBlanc – Friends
- Eric McCormack – Will & Grace
- John C. McGinley – Scrubs
- Damon Wayans – My Wife and Kids

=== Best Actor – Miniseries or TV Film ===
William H. Macy – Door to Door

- Ted Danson – Living with the Dead
- Albert Finney – The Gathering Storm
- Harry Lennix – Keep the Faith, Baby
- Patrick Stewart – King of Texas

=== Best Actress – Drama Series ===
CCH Pounder – The Shield

- Jennifer Garner – Alias
- Sarah Michelle Gellar – Buffy the Vampire Slayer
- Allison Janney – The West Wing
- Maura Tierney – ER

=== Best Actress – Musical or Comedy Series ===
Debra Messing – Will & Grace

- Jennifer Aniston – Friends
- Alexis Bledel – Gilmore Girls
- Lauren Graham – Gilmore Girls
- Bonnie Hunt – Life with Bonnie

=== Best Actress – Miniseries or TV Film ===
Vanessa Williams – Keep the Faith, Baby

- Kathy Bates – My Sister's Keeper
- Stockard Channing – The Matthew Shepard Story
- Marcia Gay Harden – King of Texas
- Vanessa Redgrave – The Gathering Storm

=== Best Miniseries ===
Taken

- The Forsyte Saga
- Master Spy: The Robert Hanssen Story
- Living with the Dead
- Shackleton

=== Best Series – Drama ===
CSI: Crime Scene Investigation

- 24
- Alias
- Buffy the Vampire Slayer
- Without a Trace

=== Best Series – Musical or Comedy ===
The Bernie Mac Show

- Curb Your Enthusiasm
- Friends
- Gilmore Girls
- Scrubs

=== Best TV Film ===
Door to Door

- The Gathering Storm
- Keep the Faith, Baby
- The Laramie Project
- Path to War

=== Best Supporting Actor – Drama Series ===
Victor Garber – Alias

- Dennis Haysbert – 24
- Anthony Heald – Boston Public
- James Marsters – Buffy the Vampire Slayer
- Ron Rifkin – Alias

=== Best Supporting Actor – Musical or Comedy Series ===
Eric Roberts – Less Than Perfect

- Sean Hayes – Will & Grace
- Peter MacNicol – Ally McBeal
- Chris Noth – Sex and the City
- David Hyde Pierce – Frasier

=== Best Supporting Actor – Miniseries or TV Film ===
Linus Roache – The Gathering Storm

- Jim Broadbent – The Gathering Storm
- Jeremy Davies – The Laramie Project
- Terry Kinney – The Laramie Project
- Roy Scheider – King of Texas

=== Best Supporting Actress – Drama Series ===
Sarah Clarke – 24

- Emma Caulfield – Buffy the Vampire Slayer
- Loretta Devine – Boston Public
- Alyson Hannigan – Buffy the Vampire Slayer
- Lena Olin – Alias

=== Best Supporting Actress – Musical or Comedy Series ===
Doris Roberts – Everybody Loves Raymond

- Kelly Bishop – Gilmore Girls
- Christa Miller – Scrubs
- Megan Mullally – Will & Grace
- Cynthia Nixon – Sex and the City

=== Best Supporting Actress – Miniseries or TV Film ===
Helen Mirren – Door to Door

- Queen Latifah – Living with the Dead
- Amy Madigan – Just a Dream
- Sissy Spacek – Last Call
- Frances Sternhagen – The Laramie Project

== New Media winners and nominees ==
=== Best DVD Extras ===
Minority Report (For the documentary)

- The Last Waltz (For the commentary)
- The Lord of the Rings: The Fellowship of the Ring (For the commentary)
- The Producers (For the documentary)
- Singin' in the Rain (For the commentary)

=== Most Innovative Story Design ===
Eternal Darkness: Sanity's Requiem

- Grand Theft Auto: Vice City
- Medal of Honor: Frontline
- Metal Gear Solid 2: Substance
- Warcraft III: Reign of Chaos

=== Outstanding Art Direction ===
Biohazard Ø

- Grand Theft Auto: Vice City
- Jet Set Radio Future
- Pro Surfer
- Mafia: The City of Lost Heaven

=== Outstanding Character ===
Shinobi (for "Shinobi")

- Maximo: Ghosts to Glory (for "Maximo")
- Ratchet & Clank (for "Ratchet")
- Sly Cooper and the Thievius Raccoonus (for "Sly Cooper")
- Spider-Man (for "Spiderman")

=== Outstanding Execution of a Gaming Concept ===
No One Lives Forever 2: A Spy in H.A.R.M.'s Way

- Eternal Darkness: Sanity's Requiem
- Mafia: The City of Lost Heaven
- Metroid Prime
- The Sims Online

=== Outstanding Overall DVD ===
The Lord of the Rings: The Fellowship of the Ring

- Buffy the Vampire Slayer (For Season 2.)
- Austin Powers in Goldmember
- A Hard Day's Night
- Minority Report
- Monterey Pop
- Y Tu Mamá También

=== Outstanding Youth DVD ===
Monsters, Inc.

- Beauty and the Beast
- Ice Age
- Jimmy Neutron: Boy Genius
- Singin' in the Rain

=== Special Humanitarian DVD ===
9/11 (Jules Naudet, Gédéon Naudet, and James Hanlon)

== Awards breakdown ==
=== Film ===
Winners:

3 / 7 Far from Heaven: Best Director / Best Film – Drama / Best Supporting Actor – Drama
2 / 2 Kissing Jessica Stein: Best Actress – Musical or Comedy / Best Supporting Actress – Musical or Comedy
2 / 3 Talk to Her (Hable con ella): Best Foreign Language Film / Best Screenplay – Original
2 / 5 My Big Fat Greek Wedding: Best Film & Supporting Actor – Musical or Comedy
2 / 5 Frida: Best Costume Design / Best Original Score
2 / 7 Gangs of New York: Best Actor – Drama / Best Art Direction / Best Editing
2 / 8 The Lord of the Rings: The Two Towers: Best Visual Effects / Outstanding Motion Picture Ensemble
1 / 1 The Kid Stays in the Picture: Best Documentary Film
1 / 1 Spirited Away (Sen to Chihiro no kamikakushi): Best Animated or Mixed Media Film
1 / 1 Sunshine State: Best Supporting Actress – Drama
1 / 1 Unfaithful: Best Actress – Drama
1 / 2 Solaris: Best Sound
1 / 3 Igby Goes Down: Best Actor – Musical or Comedy
1 / 4 The Quiet American: Best Actor – Drama
1 / 5 About a Boy: Best Original Song
1 / 6 Adaptation.: Best Screenplay – Adapted
1 / 7 Road to Perdition: Best Cinematography

Losers:

0 / 5 The Hours
0 / 4 The Good Girl
0 / 3 Austin Powers in Goldmember, Chicago, Lovely & Amazing, Punch-Drunk Love
0 / 2 25th Hour, About Schmidt, Antwone Fisher, Ice Age, One Hour Photo, Tadpole

=== Television ===
Winners:

3 / 3 Door to Door: Best Actor – Miniseries or TV Film / Best Supporting Actress – Miniseries or TV Film / Best TV Film
2 / 2 The Bernie Mac Show: Best Actor – Musical or Comedy Series / Best Series – Musical or Comedy Series
2 / 3 24: Best Actor – Drama Series / Best Supporting Actress – Drama Series
1 / 1 CSI: Crime Scene Investigation: Best Series – Drama
1 / 1 Everybody Loves Raymond: Best Supporting Actress – Musical or Comedy Series
1 / 1 Less Than Perfect: Best Supporting Actor – Musical or Comedy Series
1 / 1 Taken: Best Miniseries
1 / 2 The Shield: Best Actress – Drama Series
1 / 3 Keep the Faith, Baby: Best Actress – Miniseries or TV Film
1 / 4 Will & Grace: Best Actress – Musical or Comedy Series
1 / 5 Alias: Best Supporting Actor – Drama Series
1 / 5 The Gathering Storm: Best Supporting Actor – Miniseries or TV Film

Losers:

0 / 5 Buffy the Vampire Slayer
0 / 4 Gilmore Girls, The Laramie Project
0 / 3 Boston Public, Friends, King of Texas, Living with the Dead, Scrubs
0 / 2 Sex and the City, The West Wing
