= King of Texas =

2002 TV film

- DVD cover
- Based on: King Lear by William Shakespeare
- Screenplay by: Stephen Harrigan
- Directed by: Uli Edel
- Starring: Patrick Stewart; Marcia Gay Harden; Lauren Holly; Julie Cox
- Music by: John Altman
- Country of origin: United States
- Original language: English

Production
- Producers: Art Levinson; Wendy Neuss-Stewart
- Cinematography: Paul Elliott
- Editor: Mark Conte
- Running time: 95 minutes
- Production companies: Milk & Honey Pictures; Flying Freehold Productions; Hallmark Entertainment; TNT Original Productions

Original release
- Network: TNT
- Release: March 23, 2002

King of Texas is a 2002 American Western television film based on William Shakespeare's King Lear and directed by Uli Edel.

== Plot ==
The film takes the plot of William Shakespeare's King Lear and places it in the Republic of Texas during the 19th century. Patrick Stewart stars as John Lear, a wealthy cattle baron and analog to King Lear. In the story, Lear exiles his youngest daughter, who is later supported by the wealthy landowner Mechacha. Lear divides his property among his daughters, only to be rejected by the eldest two of them once they have it.

== Cast ==
- Patrick Stewart as John Lear (King Lear)
- Marcia Gay Harden as Mrs. Susannah Lear Tumlinson (Goneril)
- Lauren Holly as Mrs. Rebecca Lear Highsmith (Regan)
- Roy Scheider as Henry Westover (Earl of Gloucester)
- David Alan Grier as Rip (amalgam of Earl "Caius" of Kent and The Fool)
- Colm Meaney as Henry Tumlinson (Duke of Albany)
- Patrick Bergin as Mr. Highsmith (Duke of Cornwall)
- Matt Letscher as Emmett Westover (Edmund of Gloucester)
- Liam Waite as Thomas Westover (Edgar of Gloucester)
- Steven Bauer as Menchaca (King of France)
- Julie Cox as Claudia Lear (Cordelia)
- Richard Lineback as Warnell (Oswald)
- Roger Cudney as Smithwick

== Awards and nominations ==
Satellite Award

- Nominated, Best Performance by an Actor in a Miniseries or a Motion Picture Made for Television - Patrick Stewart
- Nominated, Best Performance by an Actor in a Supporting Role in a Series, Miniseries or a Motion Picture Made for Television - Roy Scheider
- Nominated, Best Performance by an Actress in a Miniseries or a Motion Picture Made for Television - Marcia Gay Harden

Western Heritage Awards

- Won, Best Television Feature Film
