= The Quiet American (2002 film) =

Political drama film by Phillip Noyce

- Theatrical release poster
- Directed by: Phillip Noyce
- Written by: Christopher Hampton; Robert Schenkkan
- Based on: The Quiet American; 1955 novel by Graham Greene
- Produced by: Staffan Ahrenberg; William Horberg
- Starring: Michael Caine; Brendan Fraser; Do Thi Hai Yen
- Cinematography: Christopher Doyle
- Edited by: John Scott
- Music by: Craig Armstrong
- Distributed by: Miramax Films
- Release dates: September 9, 2002 (TIFF); November 22, 2002 (United States); May 22, 2003 (Germany)
- Running time: 101 minutes
- Countries: Germany; United States; United Kingdom; France
- Language: English
- Budget: $30 million
- Box office: $27.7 million

The Quiet American is a 2002 political drama film directed by Phillip Noyce, and stars Michael Caine, Brendan Fraser, and Do Thi Hai Yen. The screenplay by Christopher Hampton and Robert Schenkkan is adapted from Graham Greene's bestselling 1955 novel of the same name set in Vietnam.

In contrast to the prior 1958 film version, which abandoned Greene's cautionary tale about foreign intervention in favor of anticommunist advocacy of American power, the 2002 film is faithful to the source novel, illustrating the moral culpability of American agents in arranging terrorist actions aimed at the French colonial government and the Viet Minh. Going beyond Greene's original work, the film utilizes a montage ending with superimposed images of American soldiers from the intervening decades of the Vietnam War.

Miramax paid $5.5 million for distribution rights in North America and some other territories, but the film was shelved after test audiences perceived it as unpatriotic in the wake of the September 11 attacks. The film finally received an Oscar qualification release in November 2002 and went on to gross US$12.9 million in limited theatrical release in the United States. The film received positive reviews from critics and Caine was nominated for the Academy Award for Best Actor.

== Plot ==
The story is set in 1952 in Saigon, Vietnam (French Indochina at that time), toward the end of the First Indochina War (1946–1954) in which French forces fought the Communist-led Viet Minh rebels. On one level, The Quiet American is a love story about the triangle that develops between Thomas Fowler, a British journalist in his fifties; Alden Pyle, a young American idealist; and Phuong, a young Vietnamese woman. On another level, it is also about the growing American involvement that led to the full-scale American war in Vietnam.

Thomas Fowler, who narrates the story, is involved in the war only as a reporter, an unengaged observer, apart from one crucial event. He lives with a young Vietnamese mistress, Phuong. Pyle, who represents America and its policies in Vietnam, poses as an aid worker but is eventually exposed as a Central Intelligence Agency operative. Pyle is sent to steer the war according to America’s interests, and is passionately devoted to the ideas of an American foreign policy theorist who said that what Vietnam needed was a "third force" to take the place of both the colonialists and the Vietnamese rebels and restore order. Pyle sets about creating a "Third Force" against the French and the Viet Minh by using a Vietnamese splinter group headed by corrupt militia leader General Thé (based on the actual Trinh Minh Thế). His arming of Thé's militia with American weaponry leads to a series of terrorist bombings in Saigon. These bombings, blamed on the Communists in order to further American outrage, kill a number of innocent people, including women and children.

Meanwhile, Pyle has made advances towards Phuong, promising the marriage and security Fowler has thus far refused her. When Fowler discovers Pyle's involvement in the bombings, the reporter urges Pyle to express remorse for the civilian deaths he caused, or express doubts about the certainty of his actions. When Pyle refuses, Fowler tacitly agrees to enable his assistant Hinh, and Hinh's Communist colleagues, to take Pyle captive. When Pyle tries to flee, Hinh fatally stabs him. Phuong subsequently returns to Fowler, and while the local French police commander suspects Fowler had a role in Pyle's murder, he has no evidence and does not pursue the matter.

== Cast ==
- Michael Caine as Thomas Fowler
- Brendan Fraser as Alden Pyle
- Do Thi Hai Yen as Phuong
- Rade Šerbedžija as Inspector Vigot
- Tzi Ma as Hinh
- Robert Stanton as Joe Tunney
- Holmes Osborne as Bill Granger
- Quang Hai as General Trình Minh Thế

== Production ==
The film was shot in Hanoi, Ho Chi Minh City, Ninh Bình and Hội An in Vietnam. The production was given permission to shoot in the country by the Vietnamese government on the grounds that "it condemns the manoeuvres of hostile forces and foreign aggressors against the Vietnamese people."

However, the film was not shot at the actual Hotel Continental Saigon in the original plot but the Caravelle Hotel opposite to it as a stand-in. It was not that the Caravelle looked anything like the Continental, but the renovations at the Continental and the cost of shooting scenes at the hotel ruled out the original as an option.

== Reception ==
The film earned positive reviews from critics, currently holding an 87% rating on Rotten Tomatoes based on 156 reviews, and an average rating of 7.65/10, with the consensus: "Thoughtful and wonderfully acted, The Quiet American manages to capture the spirit of Green[e]'s novel." It also has a score of 84 out of 100 on Metacritic, based on 39 critics, indicating "universal acclaim".

The first rough cut was screened to a test audience on September 10, 2001 and received positive ratings. However, the September 11 attacks took place the next day, and audience ratings dropped with each subsequent screening. Reacting to audience perception that the film was not patriotic, Miramax shelved the film for a year. The Quiet American was finally screened publicly at the Toronto International Film Festival in September 2002 to critical acclaim. The film received an Oscar qualification release in November 2002 and a limited release in January 2003.

The theatrical release ran 118 minutes. Subsequent television and video releases cut 17 minutes, and run 101 minutes. Cut were: a kissing scene between Fowler and his young mistress, Phuong; Pyle's courtship of Phuong while Fowler is away, including a dimly lit sex scene; and much of the exposition of the police investigation at the end of the film.

== Accolades ==
Academy Awards

- Best Actor (Michael Caine) - Nominated

Golden Globe Awards

- Best Actor – Motion Picture Drama (Michael Caine) - Nominated

BAFTA Awards

- Best Actor in a Leading Role (Michael Caine) - Nominated

American Film Institute Awards

- Movie of the Year - Won

London Film Critics' Circle Awards

- Director of the Year (Phillip Noyce) - Won
- Actor of the Year (Michael Caine) - Won

National Board of Review

- Best Director (Phillip Noyce) - Won
- Top Ten Films - Won

National Society of Film Critics Awards

- Best Actor (Michael Caine) - 2nd place

Satellite Awards

- Best Motion Picture, Drama (Phillip Noyce) - Nominated
- Best Director (Phillip Noyce) - Nominated
- Best Actor - Motion Picture, Drama (Michael Caine) - Won
- Best Supporting Actress - Motion Picture, Drama (Đỗ Thị Hải Yến) - Nominated

== See also ==
- List of historical drama films of Asia
