= Cines del Sur =

Spanish international film festival

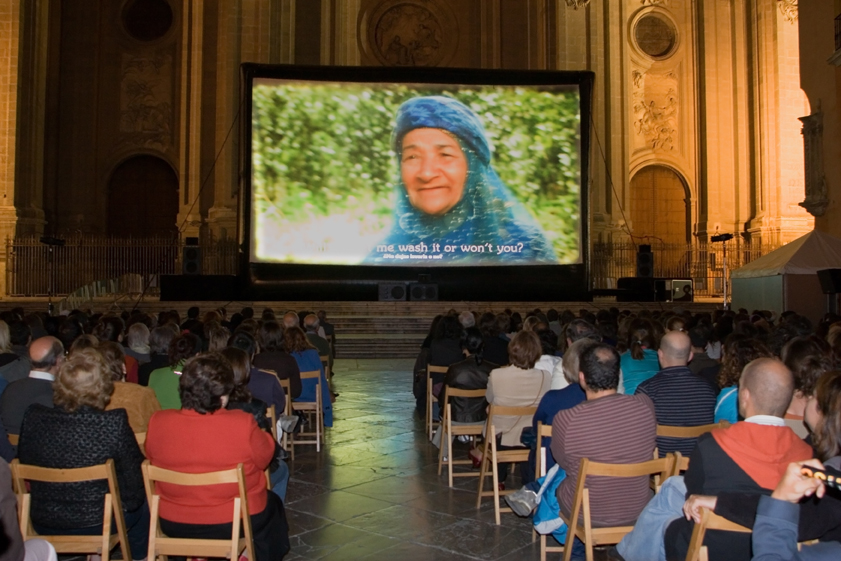
Open Screen. Cines del Sur. Second Edition 2008, Plaza de las Pasiegas Granada.

Cines del Sur is an international film festival in Granada, Spain, that focuses on emerging cinemas belonging to what is known as the geo-political south. Film productions (from Asia, Africa and Latin America) which often have limited distribution and screening opportunities find in Cines del Sur a platform to help them gain recognition. Beyond its appearance as a showcase of films, Cines del Sur is also a place for encounters, discussion and sharing among professionals, film lovers and people interested in broadening their social, cultural, economic and political perspective of the globalized world. The festival encourages reflection and debate on the enormous value of diversity and cultural exchange.

Cines del Sur was first held in 2007.

== Programming ==
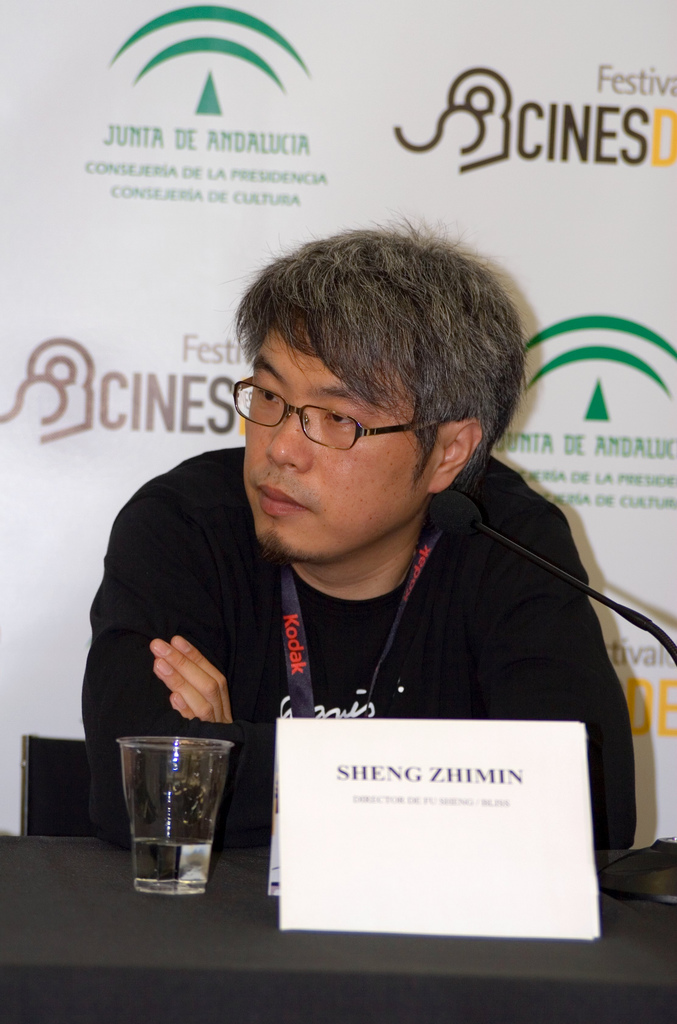
The Chinese filmmaker Sheng Zhimin, 2007.

=== Sections ===
Cines del Sur has two competitive sections: the Official Section, for feature-length works filmed in 35 mm, and the Mediterráneos Section, with awards given to films made in video. The Itineraries Section (an informative section) is a sample of productions from countries of the geopolitical south.

The Festival brings together an international jury each year to choose the winning films.

=== Retrospectives ===
The festival offers two retrospectives that can have different focal points, ranging from tributes to particular filmmakers to film series organised by subject matter, and even retrospectives that take an in-depth look at filmmakers who are still active, at a certain historical period or at a country with limited production.

=== Open screen ===
While the festival takes place, several squares and public buildings in Granada become large outdoor cinemas, where a diverse audience joins to enjoy the films.

=== Parallel activities ===
A number of events with scholars in the field are organised during the festival and throughout the year, as are film and video workshops, exhibits, seminars, round tables and outdoor screenings.

=== Publications ===
Study and reflection on the cinemas of the south find their place in the Festival's publications, which serve to inform readers about the films screened and the subjects and figures who receive tribute in the retrospectives.
