= Kite Awards (Vietnam) =

Vietnam Cinema Association Awards
- Current: 2026 Kite Awards
- Awarded for: Excellence in film and television
- Country: Vietnam
- Presented by: Vietnam Cinema Association
- Rewards: Prize A for Best Film (1993-2001); Golden Kite for Best Film (since 2002)
- First award: November 14, 1993; 33 years ago (as Annual VCA Awards); March 13, 2003; 23 years ago (as Kite Awards)
- Website: https://thegioidienanh.vn/

Television/radio coverage
- Network: VTV

The Vietnam Cinema Association Awards, popularly known as the Kite Awards or Golden Kite Awards (Vietnamese: Giải thưởng Hội Điện ảnh Việt Nam, Giải Cánh diều or Cánh diều vàng) since 2003, is an annual awards ceremony, recognizing the excellence of Vietnamese films, television series and videos produced during a year in Vietnam. The ceremony is usually held early next year.

In spite of receiving a lot of criticism, this is still the most popular film and television awards in Vietnam.

== History ==
In essence, Vietnam Cinema Association Awards is an internal awards in the award system of Literary Arts Association, which includes 7 associations: photography, architecture, cinema, music, theatre, literature, and art. In order to encourage the artists' works, every year, the government provides the funds to the associations to award them.

The Vietnam Film Association Awards was originally presented by the Association as an award within the framework of the Vietnam Film Festival. Since 1993, VCA officially separated from the Film Festival and organizes its own awards annually. The first awards ceremony was to consider awards for films released in the period 1991-1993.

In March 2003 on the 50th anniversary of the Vietnam Revolutionary Cinema (1953), VCA initiated the Golden Kite Prize, and combined with Vietnam Television station, broadcast the ceremony live with the support of the business through advertising. Since then, the Awards is held independently and usually called as Golden Kite Awards or Kite Awards. Along with Golden Kite, Silver Kite and Bronze Kite are also given, though some years they are removed.

== Categories ==
Throughout the history of the awards, many categories have been changed. A prize can be given to numerous winners, or will not be given if the nominees are not good enough to achieve. Those listed below are the most current ones.

=== Film ===
==== Movies ====
- Golden Kite Prize
- Silver Kite Prize
- Certificate of Merit
- Best Director
- Best Screenplay
- Best Cinematography
- Best Art Design
- Best Original Score
- Best Sound
- Best Leading Actor
- Best Leading Actress
- Best Supporting Actor
- Best Supporting Actress
- Promising Actor/Actress

==== Documentary ====
- Golden Kite Prize
- Silver Kite Prize
- Certificate of Merit
- Best Director
- Best Cinematography

==== Science ====
- Golden Kite Prize
- Silver Kite Prize
- Certificate of Merit

==== Animated ====
- Golden Kite Prize
- Silver Kite Prize
- Certificate of Merit
- Best Director
- Best Animator

==== Short Subject ====
- Golden Kite Prize
- Silver Kite Prize
- Certificate of Merit

=== Television ===
- Golden Kite Prize
- Silver Kite Prize
- Certificate of Merit
- Best Director
- Best Screenwriter
- Best Cinematography
- Best Leading Actor
- Best Leading Actress
- Best Supporting Actor
- Best Supporting Actress
- Promising Actor/Actress

=== Film Critic/Theory Research ===
- Golden Kite Prize
- Silver Kite Prize
- Certificate of Merit

== See also ==
- Cinema of Vietnam
