= Doãn Quốc Đam =

Vietnamese actor

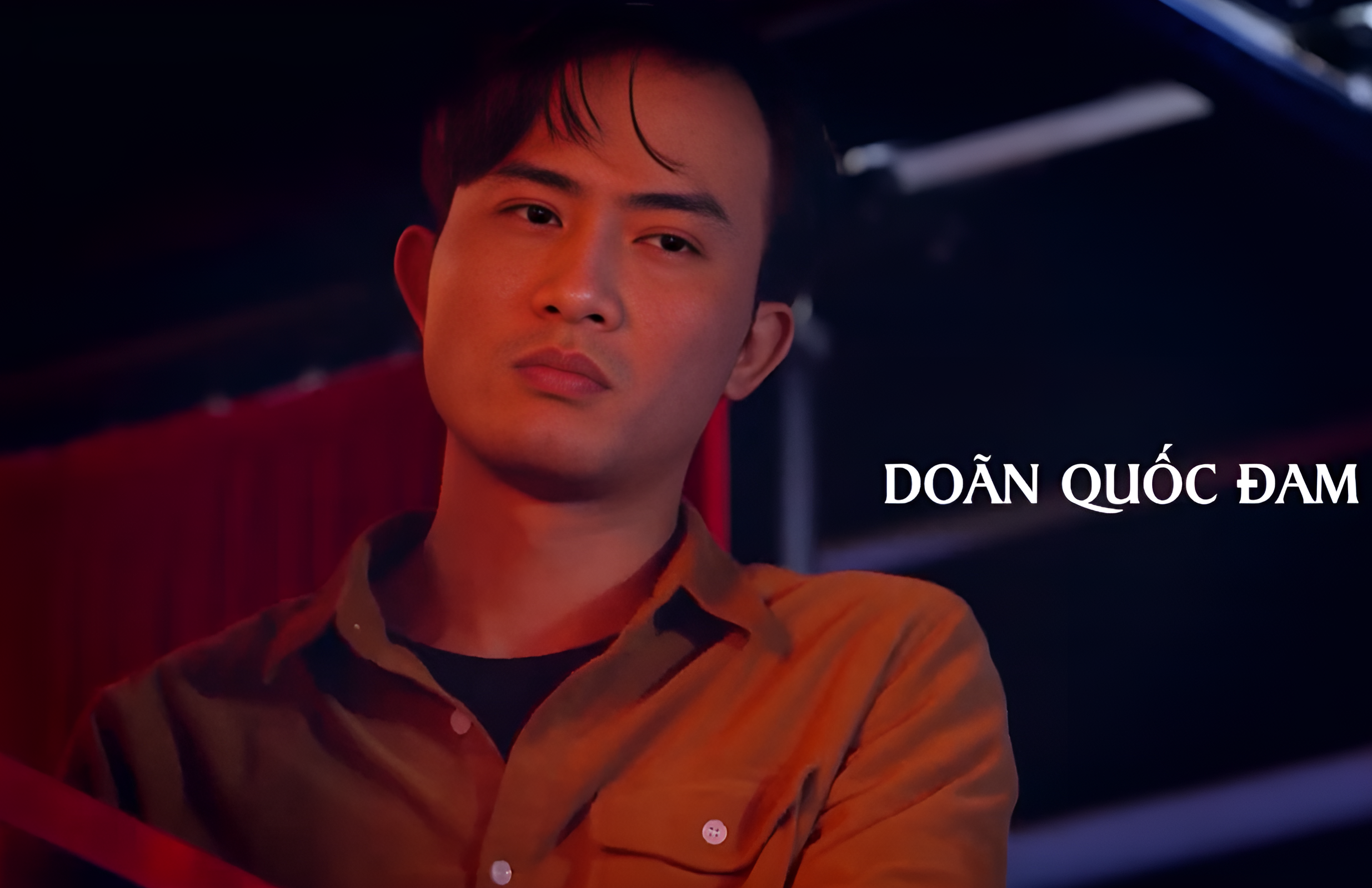
- Doãn Quốc Đam in 2020
- Born: Doãn Quốc Đam; September 9, 1988 (age 37); Thái Nguyên, Vietnam
- Occupations: Actor; Model
- Years active: 2011–present
- Height: 1.73 m (5 ft 8 in)

Đào Trọng Hùng, also known by his stage name Doãn Quốc Đam (born September 9, 1988), (Note: Some information says his year of birth is 1990.) he is a Vietnamese actor working mainly at Vietnam Television Film Center (VFC).

== Biography ==
Đam was a student of Hanoi Academy of Theatre and Cinema. In 2018, he left an impression on the audience through the movie Quynh doll (Quỳnh búp bê) with the role of Handsome Canh (Cảnh soái ca). In 2019, he continued with the role of Fedora/"Fotomat" Long Nhật in the series Maze (Mê cung) of the famous series Criminal Police.

== Filmography ==
=== TV series ===
Year	Film	Channel	Character	Role	Film director	Partner	Source
2011	Mùa tinh khôi	VTV3	Đạt	Supporting cast	Đào Duy Phúc	Thuỳ Liên, Đình Chiến, Thuý Vi, Hùng Chilhyun	
2013	Giọt nước rơi	VTV3	Tú	Supporting cast	Bùi Quốc Việt	Chi Pu, Hồng Đăng, Bảo Thanh, Trần Đức, Thanh Quý	
2013	Cảnh sát hình sự: Bản di chúc bí ẩn	VTV3	Hoàng Tùng	Supporting cast	Trịnh Lê Phong	Lan Hương, Đỗ Kỷ, Phan Anh, Mạnh Hưng, Vũ Hải, Quỳnh Hoa	
2013	Chạm tay vào nỗi nhớ	VTV3	Mễ	Supporting cast	Vũ Hồng Sơn	Saetti Baggio, Diệp Anh, Thanh Sơn	
2015	Khi đàn chim trở về 3	VTV1	Lâm "Voi"	Supporting cast	Nguyễn Danh Dũng	Việt Anh	
2015	Cảnh sát hình sự: Câu hỏi số 5	VTV3	Khánh "Què"	Supporting cast	Bùi Quốc Việt	Chí Nhân, Kiều Thanh	
2015	Khép mắt chờ ngày mai	VTV3	Long	Supporting cast	Vũ Trường Khoa	Như Quỳnh, Ngọc Tản, Khuất Quỳnh Hoa, Mạnh Cường	
2015	Bạch mã hoàng tử	VTV3	Huấn	Supporting cast	Vũ Minh Trí	Phạm Anh Tuấn, Nguyễn Minh Trang, Đỗ Hà Anh, Bùi Hà Anh	
2016	Mạch ngầm vùng biên ải	VTV1	Đường	Supporting cast	Bùi Huy Thuần	Đình Tú, Bảo Anh	
2016	Lựa chọn cuối cùng	VTV1	Kiên	Supporting cast	Vũ Hồng Sơn	Mạnh Cường, Chí Nhân, Thanh Sơn, Minh Hà	
2017	The Arbitrator	VTV3	Trần Tú	Supporting cast	Nguyễn Mai Hiền, Nguyễn Khải Anh, Nguyễn Danh Dũng	Bảo Thanh, Hồng Đăng, Việt Anh, Trọng Hùng	
2017	Lặng yên dưới vực sâu	VTV3	Phống	Main role	Đào Duy Phúc	Phương Oanh, Đình Tú, Hương Giang	
2018	Quỳnh búp bê	VTV1, VTV3	Cảnh	Main role	Mai Hồng Phong	Phương Oanh, Thu Quỳnh, Thanh Hương	
2019	Xin chào, người lạ ơi!	VTV1	Sơn	Main role	Trịnh Lê Phong	Tiến Lộc, Phanh Lee, Thanh Hương, Trọng Trinh, Hương Dung	
2019	Ánh sáng trước mặt	VTV8	Định	Supporting role	Trần Hoài Sơn, Nguyễn Danh Dũng	Trần Nghĩa, Đỗ Duy Nam, Phan Minh Huyền, Bảo Thanh	
2019	Cảnh sát hình sự: Mê cung	VTV3	Fedora/Nhật "Fotomat"	Supporting role	Nguyễn Khải Anh, Trần Trọng Khôi	Hồng Đăng, Hoàng Thuỳ Linh, Việt Anh, Phan Thắng	
2019	Sinh tử	VTV1	Colonel Đào Duy Thông	Supporting role	Khải Hưng, Nguyễn Mai Hiền	Mạnh Trường, Việt Anh, Thanh Hương, Duy Hưng	
2020	Cảnh sát hình sự: Hồ sơ cá sấu	VTV3	Cương "Chột"	Main role	Nguyễn Mai Hiền	Hoàng Hải, Kiều Anh, Mạnh Trường, Bảo Anh, Phan Minh Huyền, Ngọc Quỳnh, Lan Phương	
2020	Hướng dương ngược nắng	VTV3	Phúc	Main role	Vũ Trường Khoa	Hồng Diễm, Lương Thu Trang, Việt Anh, Hồng Đăng	
2020	Gái ngàn đô	Galaxy Play	Vinh	Main role	Bùi Huy Thuần	Quỳnh Lương, Bảo Anh, Ngọc Quỳnh	
2021	Hương vị tình thân	VTV1	Mr Sinh (young)	Supporting role	Nguyễn Danh Dũng	Phương Oanh, Mạnh Trường, Võ Hoài Nam, Công Lý, Đỗ Duy Nam	
2021	Thương ngày nắng về	VTV3	Đông Phong	Main role	Bùi Tiến Huy, Vũ Trường Khoa	Thanh Quý, Đình Tú, Phan Minh Huyền, Nguyễn Ngọc Huyền, Quang Trọng	
2021	Phố trong làng	VTV1	Vũ Văn Mến	Main role	Nguyễn Mai Hiền	Phạm Anh Tuấn, Duy Hưng, Ngô Lệ Quyên, Mạnh Đạt, Lê Tuấn Anh, Lưu Duy Khánh, Phùng Đức Hiếu, Phạm Ngọc Anh	
2022	Thương ngày nắng về 2	VTV3	Đông Phong	Main role	Bùi Tiến Huy, Vũ Trường Khoa	Thanh Quý, Lan Phương, Đình Tú, Phan Minh Huyền, Nguyễn Ngọc Huyền, Quang Trọng	
2022	Đấu trí	VTV1	Phan Đình Tuấn	Main role	Nguyễn Danh Dũng, Bùi Quốc Việt, Nguyễn Đức Hiếu	Trung Anh, Thanh Sơn, Lương Thu Trang, Nguyệt Hằng, Phạm Anh Tuấn, Xuân Phúc, Anh Đào	
2022	Gái ngàn đô 2	Galaxy Play	Vinh	Main role	Bùi Huy Thuần	Yumi Thiên Nga, Ngọc Quỳnh, Bảo Anh, Sỹ Hưng, Ánh Ngọc, Ngọc Anh	
2022	Gara hạnh phúc	VTV3	Blind man	Cameo	Bùi Quốc Việt	Quỳnh Kool, Nguyễn Hoàng Ngọc Huyền, Bảo Anh, Duy Hưng, Bình An, Phạm Anh Tuấn	
2022	Hành trình công lý	VTV3	Hoàng Minh Cường	Supporting role	Nguyễn Mai Hiền	Minh Hoà, Đức Hùng, Việt Anh, Hà Việt Dũng, Hồng Diễm, Thu Quỳnh, Quốc Huy, Thanh Hương	
2023	Gia đình mình vui bất thình lình	VTV3	Nguyễn Văn Thành	Main role	Nguyễn Đức Hiếu, Lê Đỗ Ngọc Linh	Bùi Bài Bình, Lan Hương 'Bông', Lan Phương, Kiều Anh, Khả Ngân, Quang Sự, Thanh Sơn	
2023	Lof Ba Vì – Sứ mệnh yêu thương	VieON	Mr. Cois/Chúa Trịnh	Main role	Nguyễn Đức Nhật Thanh	Xuân Bắc, Chiều Xuân, Thu Quỳnh, Song Luân, Xuân Nghị	
2023	Bầu trời khát vọng	Truyền hình Tâm Lộc Phát	Nam	Main role	An Thuyên	Quang Tèo, Mạnh Hưng	
2023	Làng trong phố	VTV1	Vũ Văn Mến	Main role	Nguyễn Mai Hiền	Ngô Lệ Quyên, Duy Hưng	
2024	Mình yêu nhau, bình yên thôi	VTV3	Lâm		Lê Đỗ Ngọc Linh	Thanh Sơn, Vũ Việt Hoa, Nguyễn Trọng Lân, Maya	
2024	Những nẻo đường gần xa	VTV1	Mr Dũng		Nguyễn Mai Hiền	Việt Anh	
2024	Nữ luật sư	SCTV14	Hai Nâu		Trọng Trinh	Trung Dũng, Ngọc Quỳnh, Kim Tuyến	
2024	Độc đạo	VTV3	Lê Vũ Hồng	Main role	Phạm Gia Phương; Trần Trọng Khôi	Duy Hưng, Hoàng Hải, Hà Việt Dũng	

=== Movies ===
Year	Film	Cast	Role	Film director	Partner	Source
2020	The Late Night Ride (Cuốc xe nửa đêm)	Lực	Supporting role	Nguyễn Nguyên Hoàng	Trương Minh Quốc Thái, Hoàng Yến Chibi, Quách Ngọc Tuyên	
2023	Peach Blossom, Pho and Piano (Đào, phở và piano)	Văn Dân	Main role	Phi Tiến Sơn	Trần Lực, Trung Hiếu, Tuấn Hưng	

== Personal life ==
Doãn Quốc Đam is a very private person about his personal life. In 2017, he married Thu Thao after 2 years of dating.

== See also ==
- Việt Anh
