= Mạnh Trường =

Vietnamese actor (born 1985)

- Born: Nguyễn Mạnh Trường; September 11, 1985 (age 40); Hanoi, Vietnam
- Occupations: Actor; Model
- Years active: 2001–present
- Height: 1.82 m (6 ft 0 in)

Mạnh Trường (full name: Nguyễn Mạnh Trường, born September 11, 1985, in Hanoi) is a Vietnamese actor and model.

== Biography and career ==
Manh Truong was born on September 11, 1985, in Hanoi. He is an actor known for his many roles in television series and some movies and videos (short TV series). Having won the Photogenic Supermodel award at the Vietnam Supermodel 2004 contest, Manh Truong quickly turned to acting with many impressive roles in many television series. Manh Truong has a diverse and colorful acting style with many roles in different situations.

== List of movies ==
=== TV series ===
Year	Film	Channel	Role	Director	Partner	Source
2001	Không phải trò đùa	VTV3	Tùng	Vũ Minh Trí	Văn Hiệp	
2008	Những cánh hoa bay	VTV3	Nguyên	Bùi Huy Thuần	Thu Hiền	
2011	Huyền sử thiên đô	VTV3	Hà Cang	Đặng Tất Bình, Phạm Thanh Phong, Nguyễn Thế Vinh, Phạm Duy Thanh	Thu Quỳnh	
2011	Nếu chỉ là giấc mơ	VTV3	Quang	Nguyễn Tiến Dũng, Trần Quang Vinh	Phùng Thu Huyền	
2012	Chân trời trắng	VTV3	Huy	Phạm Gia Phương, Nguyễn Đức Hiếu	Diệp Anh	
2012	Đỗ quyên trong mưa	HTV9	Hà Nguyên	Bùi Nam Yên	Hồ Thái Huy	
2013	Cảnh sát hình sự: Bí mật tam giác vàng	VTV3	Minh Hoàn	Nguyễn Dương	Nhung Kate, Diễm Hằng	
2013	Hương ngọc lan	VTV3	Nguyên	Nguyễn Đức Hiếu	Thu Quỳnh, Vũ Thu Hoài	
2013	Hoa nở trái mùa	VTV3	Việt	Nguyễn Khải Anh, Nguyễn Đức Hiếu	Thanh Vân Hugo, Hải Anh, Thùy Dương	
2015	Người đứng trong gió	VTV3	Hữu Khánh	Bùi Nam Yên, Trần Quế Ngọc	Thân Thúy Hà, Hà Việt Dũng, Nhã Phương	
2015	Đường lên Điện Biên	VTV1	Hùng	Bùi Tuấn Dũng	Hoàng Hải	
2016	Zippo, mù tạt và em	VTV3	Sơn	Trọng Trinh, Bùi Tiến Huy	Hồng Đăng, Lã Thanh Huyền, Việt Anh	
2016	Tuổi thanh xuân 2	VTV3	Phong	Nguyễn Khải Anh, Bùi Tiến Huy, Myung Hyun Woo	Nhã Phương, Kang Tae Oh	
2017	Nơi ẩn nấp bình yên	VTV1	Duy Trung	Nguyễn Khải Hưng, Nguyễn Đức Hiếu	Thu Quỳnh	
2017	Ngược chiều nước mắt	VTV1	Thành	Vũ Minh Trí	Phương Oanh, Thu Quỳnh, Phan Minh Huyền, Hà Việt Dũng	
2017	Cả một đời ân oán	VTV3	Hoàng Đăng	Trọng Trinh, Vũ Trường Khoa, Bùi Tiến Huy	Hồng Đăng, Hồng Diễm, Lan Phương	
2018	Chạy trốn thanh xuân	VTV3	Nam	Vũ Minh Trí, Nguyễn Đức Hiếu	Phan Minh Huyền, Huỳnh Anh, Bình An, Lưu Đê Ly	
2019	Sinh tử	VTV1	Bùi Tiến Huy	Nguyễn Mai Hiền, Nguyễn Khải Hưng	Việt Anh, Doãn Quốc Đam, Chí Nhân, Thanh Hương	
2020	Tình yêu và tham vọng	VTV3	Kiều Phong	Bùi Tiến Huy	Lã Thanh Huyền, Diễm My, Nhan Phúc Vinh, Thanh Sơn, Phan Minh Huyền	
2020	Cảnh sát hình sự: Hồ sơ cá sấu	VTV3	Lê Anh Hải	Nguyễn Mai Hiền	Phan Minh Huyền, Hoàng Hải, Việt Anh, Doãn Quốc Đam, Kiều Anh	
2021	Hương vị tình thân	VTV1	Hoàng Long	NSƯT Nguyễn Danh Dũng	Phương Oanh, Thu Quỳnh	
2023	Đừng nói khi yêu	VTV3	Kim Quy (Leo Nguyễn)	Bùi Tiến Huy	Đình Tú, Thùy Anh, Trình Mỹ Duyên	
2023	Chúng ta của 8 năm sau	VTV3	Lâm	Bùi Tiến Huy	Phan Minh Huyền, Quỳnh Kool, Thùy Anh	
2025	Không thời gian	VTV1	Lieutenant Colonel Lê Nguyên Đại	Nguyễn Danh Dũng, Nguyễn Đức Hiếu	Lê Xuân Anh, Đào Chí Nhân, Lưu Duy Khánh	

=== Movies ===
Year	Movie	Role	Director	Partner	Source
2007	Mùa thu không cô đơn		Trần Trung Dũng		
2015	Ho Chi Minh in Siam	Thầu Chín	Bui Tuan Dung	Hoàng Hải	

== Personal life ==
Lan Phuong and Manh Truong were classmates since middle school. After finishing high school, Lan Phuong's family arranged for her to move to Germany to settle down, but she did not go and stayed. She advised Manh Truong to take the entrance exam to Hanoi University of Theatre and Cinema. In 2008, Manh Truong got married at the age of 23. The day Lan Phuong and Manh Truong got engaged was also the day Hanoi was flooded. Currently, the couple has a son and a daughter. Chip, whose real name is Nguyen Phuong Linh, joined Manh Truong in the show Dad! Where are we going? (season 2). On November 22, 2022, his family welcomed a third member, a boy.

== Model Contest ==
- Vietnam Supermodel Contest 2004
  - Hanoi area and Northern provinces: Style Award
  - Nationwide: Top 10 (Male), Photogenic Supermodel Award

== TV Show ==
- Dad! Where are we going? (season 2) (Bố ơi, mình đi đâu thế (mùa 2))
  - Join with daughter (Nguyen Phuong Linh, nickname Chip)
- Who Wants to Be a Millionaire (Ai là Triệu Phú)
  - As a supporter for Viet Anh in question number 9 (Right to assist in making phone calls to relatives) on July 13, 2021 and as a player on March 31, 2024
- * Weekend Date (Cuộc hẹn cuối tuần)
  - Guest with Phuong Oanh
- The Price Is Right (Hãy chọn giá đúng)
  - Program participants
