= Việt Anh (actor, born 1981) =

Vietnamese actor

Meritorious Artist Việt Anh
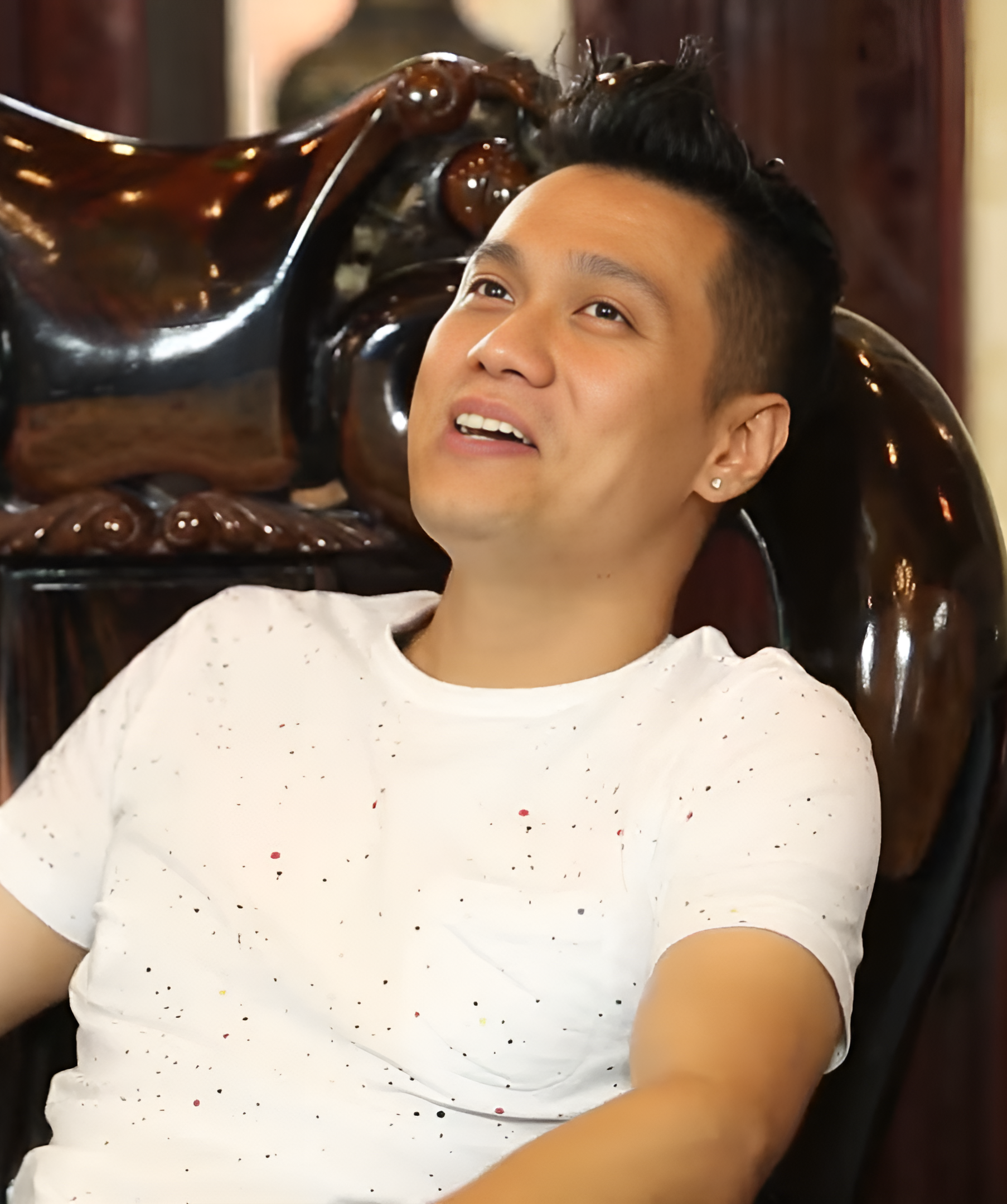
- Viet Anh in 2017
- Born: Nguyễn Lê Việt Anh; September 8, 1981 (age 44); Hanoi, Vietnam
- Occupations: Actor; MC; Film director; Film producer
- Years active: 2004–present
- Height: 1.77 m (5 ft 10 in)
- Title: Meritorious Artist (2023)

Nguyễn Lê Việt Anh (born September 8, 1981), commonly known by his stage name Việt Anh, is a Vietnamese actor.

== Biography ==
Viet Anh was born in 1981 in Hanoi. He is the youngest of two siblings, his older brother Nguyen Le Viet Thang is 2 years older than him. Although both his parents were state civil servants, due to the economic difficulties of that time, his whole family lived with his grandparents and 2 uncles in an apartment on the 4th floor of Kim Lien Collective Area, Đống Đa district. When he was in secondary school, his parents divorced, the two siblings lived with their mother while his father moved to live in Ho Chi Minh City.

== Career ==
After graduating from National Economics University. In 2003, his chance to enter the film industry was formed when he was forced to attend a TV actor training class of Vietnam Television Film Centre (this was the first year of the actor training course organized by VFC). Here, he met the head teacher Hoàng Dũng (at that time he was a Meritorious Artist and the Director of Hanoi Drama Theater), a teacher that Viet Anh initially felt unsympathetic and uncomfortable with, but later he respected and admired him very much.

=== 2006 – 2008: Famous for Justice for sale (Chạy án) ===
On the TV, with his good-looking and tall appearance, Viet Anh is often assigned by directors to play villain roles. After a number of films that did not leave much of an impression, his acting career turned a new page since he participated in 2 parts of the film Justice for sale (Chạy án). After the resounding success of the two parts of the series, from an unknown actor, Viet Anh gradually became familiar to audiences nationwide. He emerged as a young and talented actor in the Northern film industry in particular and Vietnam in general.

=== 2009 – 2016: Self-made film and won the Golden Kite Award ===
Initially gaining a foothold in the profession, Viet Anh established the New Style Advertising and Event Services Joint Stock Company (New Style) headquartered in Ho Chi Minh City, with himself as the director, and his brother Viet Thang as the manager of New Style's projects. At the end of 2009, Viet Anh's New Style Company cooperated with NS Picture (Toan Phuong Advertising Services Limited Liability Company) to produce the film Where Love Begins; this is a 30-episode psychological and emotional drama about the smile surgery journey of the Operation Smile organization, ordered by HTV to be broadcast on HTV7 around April 2010. In the film, Viet Anh also participated in the role of lawyer Quoc Minh; however, after the film started filming for 5 episodes, New Style had a capital dispute with its partner, causing the film project to be stalled. Director Ho Ngoc Xum turned to other film projects, HTV had to change its broadcast schedule, and the two production companies were caught up in a spiral of litigation. After the first instance (July 19, 2010) and appeal (January 11, 2011) trials, Viet Anh's company was declared the winner of the lawsuit by the Supreme People's Court in Ho Chi Minh City and was awarded 99 million VND in compensation. The film project was later canceled.

On October 8, 2015, Viet Anh held a press conference to announce the movie project produced by his company called Bodyguard, Lady and Fool (Vệ sĩ, tiểu thư và thằng khờ). In this film, in addition to his role as an actor, this is the first film that Viet Anh participates in as a Producer, co-director and co-screenwriter. Filming began on October 12, 2015. This film is considered the first Vietnamese film to exploit the poetic and majestic beauty of the world's natural wonder Ha Long Bay. The film was then officially released in theaters on December 2, 2016.

=== 2017–present: Continued success with The Arbitrator ===
Around the end of March 2017, he marked his return to the crime film genre when he participated in filming the film The Arbitrator (Người phán xử) with a script inherited from The Arbitrator of the Israeli television film industry, this is a film in the series Criminal Police of VFC but The Arbitrator does not delve into the work of police officers investigating and solving cases, but it is a multi-dimensional picture of life, thoughts, emotions, complex relationships and the battle for power in the modern underworld. In The Arbitrator, Viet Anh plays the role of the rich kid Phan Hai – the son of the boss of Phan Thi Group, Phan Quan (played by People's Artist Hoàng Dũng. Phan Hai is a spoiled young master since childhood, so he has a playful nature, is impulsive, hot-tempered, always does things his way and causes a lot of trouble for himself and his family's Phan Thi Group. In addition, although he is married to Diem My (played by Dan Le), a beautiful lawyer, and has a son named Phan Hung, Phan Hai still often has an affair with his capricious girlfriend Van Diep played by Thanh Bi (after Van Diep left him for fear of Phan Hai's revenge, Huong "phố" played by Tran Thuy An), which greatly affects the family's happiness. As for Viet Anh, he once again proved that playing the villain is his forte when he was able to portray the danger and brutality of Phan Hai but still sometimes showed his naivety through humorous lines or scenes where he "acted like he wasn't acting" when paired with his teacher Hoang Dung.

== Personal life ==
In early 2007, Viet Anh married reporter Thuy Linh. The wedding took place on February 26, 2007. Linh was a student of Viet Anh's mother when she was an English teacher. Due to work requirements, Linh moved to work as an editor at Ho Chi Minh City Television (HTV). Viet Anh decided to move to Ho Chi Minh City with his wife to start a career. After a period of living together, they had a daughter named Song Anh and then the two officially divorced on January 15, 2010. After the divorce, Linh and her daughter moved to the US to settle down.

In early 2016, Viet Anh registered to marry his girlfriend Tran Huong but the two had organized the wedding before. Tran Huong was born in 1989 and is a freelancer. On the morning of March 7, 2017, she gave birth to her first baby boy at a hospital in Hanoi. Viet Anh gave to his son nickname is Đậu. In 2019, he and his wife announced their divorced.

== Works ==
=== TV Series ===
| Year | Movie | Channel | Role | Director | Co-starring | Notes | Source |
|---|---|---|---|---|---|---|---|
| 2004 | Lời thề cỏ non | VTV1 | Việt Anh | Hoàng Lâm | Hồng Đăng, Diệu Hương, Phương Điệp | Special production for VFC actor class number 1 | |
| 2005 | Bản lĩnh người đẹp | VTV3 | Đông | Nguyễn Anh Tuấn | Thanh Mai, Đường Minh Giang, Phú Thăng, Thanh Chi, Lệ Quyên | | |
| 2005 | Dòng sông phẳng lặng | VTV3 | Phi Hùng | Đỗ Đức Thành | Kiều Thanh | | |
| 2005 | Con đường gian khổ | VTV3 | Luân | Nguyễn Hữu Phần | Hoa Thúy | | |
| 2006 | Cảnh sát hình sự: Chạy án | VTV1 | Cao Thanh Lâm | Vũ Hồng Sơn | Phan Hòa | | |
| 2008 | Cảnh sát hình sự: Chạy án 2 | VTV1 | Cao Thanh Lâm | Vũ Hồng Sơn | Phan Hòa | | |
| 2008 | Chàng trai đa cảm | VTV1 | Tuấn | Trần Trung Dũng | Hồng Diễm | | |
| 2008 | Gia tài bác sĩ | HTV9 | Lộc | Nguyễn Minh Cao | Thanh Hằng | | |
| 2009 | Gió nghịch mùa | HTV7 | Hoàng Minh | Đặng Lưu Việt Bảo | Lý Nhã Kỳ | | |
| 2009 | Quán kem tình nhân | HTV7 | Long | Lê Quang Hưng | Yeye Nhật Hạ | | |
| 2011 | Cảnh sát hình sự: Chỉ còn lại tình yêu | VTV1 | Lợi | Vũ Minh Trí | Thiên Bảo | | |
| 2012 | Chân trời trắng | VTV3 | Thắng | Phạm Gia Phương | Kim Oanh | | |
| 2012 | Vòng xoáy bạc | VTV9 | Đức Sơn | Đặng Tất Bình – Nguyễn Hoài Thu | Nhật Kim Anh | | |
| 2012 | Ông tơ hai phẩy | VTV1 | Long | Nguyễn Danh Dũng | Phan Minh Huyền | | |
| 2013 | Ranh giới mong manh | HTV9 | Tâm | Nguyễn Mạnh Hà | Kim Tuyến | | |
| 2013 | Bóng tối rực rỡ | VTV9 | Bảo Hoàng | Trần Quang Đại | Lê Khánh | | |
| 2013 | Tình yêu không hẹn trước | VTV3 | Huy | Trọng Trinh – Bùi Tiến Huy | Lã Thanh Huyền | | |
| 2013 | Chỉ có thể là yêu | VTV3 | Hải Long | Vũ Minh Trí | Linh Phương | | |
| 2014 | Tuổi thanh xuân | VTV3 | Hưng | Nguyễn Khải Anh – Bùi Tiến Huy – Myung Hyun Woo | Kim Tuyến | | |
| 2015 | Khi đàn chim trở về 3 | VTV1 | Thành | Nguyễn Danh Dũng | Vân Anh, Kiều Thanh | | |
| 2015 | Khúc hát mặt trời | VTV3 | Lâm | Vũ Trường Khoa | Đinh Hương | | |
| 2016 | Zippo, mù tạt và em | VTV3 | Quân | Trọng Trinh – Bùi Tiến Huy | Vân Anh | | |
| 2017 | Moskva - Mùa thay lá | VTV1 | Đức | Trọng Trinh | Hồng Đăng, Hồng Diễm | | |
| 2017 | Người phán xử | VTV3 | Phan Hải | Nguyễn Mai Hiền – Nguyễn Khải Anh – Nguyễn Danh Dũng | Hoàng Dũng, Hồng Đăng, Thanh Hương, Đan Lê | | |
| 2017 | Cư dân thông thái | VTV6 | Thịnh | | Thanh Hương | | |
| 2017 | Sống chung với mẹ chồng | VTV1 | Sơn | Vũ Trường Khoa | Bảo Thanh | | |
| 2018 | Phía trước là cả một đời phán xử | VTV Giải Trí | Phan Hải | Đỗ Thanh Hải | Thu Nga | Short film | |
| 2019 | Mê cung | VTV3 | Lawer Đông Hoà | Nguyễn Khải Anh – Trần Trọng Khôi | Hồng Đăng, Hoàng Thùy Linh, Thuỳ Dương | | |
| 2019 | Sinh tử | VTV1 | Mai Hồng Vũ | Khải Hưng – Nguyễn Mai Hiền | Chí Nhân, Quỳnh Nga | | |
| 2020 | Hồ sơ cá sấu | VTV3 | Đặng Trung | NSƯT Nguyễn Mai Hiền | Mạnh Trường, Hoàng Hải, Doãn Quốc Đam, Ngọc Quỳnh, Kiều Anh, Lan Phương, Phan Minh Huyền | | |
| 2020 | Hướng dương ngược nắng | VTV3 | Hoàng | Vũ Trường Khoa | Lương Thu Trang | | |
| 2022 | Chồng cũ, vợ cũ, người yêu cũ | VTV3 | Việt | Vũ Trường Khoa | Lã Thanh Huyền, Thúy Hằng | | |
| 2022 | Hành trình công lý | VTV3 | Phạm Đức Hoàng | Nguyễn Mai Hiền | Hồng Diễm, Thu Quỳnh | | |
| 2023 | Cuộc chiến không giới tuyến | VTV1 | Border Guard Lieutenant Colonel Trần Đình Trung | Nguyễn Danh Dũng | Hoàng Hải, Thu Quỳnh | | |
| 2024 | Những nẻo đường gần xa | VTV1 | Vinh | Nguyễn Mai Hiền | Cù Thị Trà, Bích Thủy | | |

=== Movies ===
- Vệ sĩ, tiểu thư và thằng khờ (2016) – actor, film director

=== Music video ===
| Year | Song | Author | Partner | References |
|---|---|---|---|---|
| 2018 | Không thể thay thế | Quang Hà | Đới Bích Hạnh | |
| 2019 | Tình đến rồi đi | Giang Hồng Ngọc | Giang Hồng Ngọc | |
| 2020 | Say tình say nghĩa | Lã Phong Lâm | Lã Phong Lâm, Đỗ Duy Nam, Jimmii Khánh. | |
