= List of VTV dramas broadcast in 2024 =

This is a list of VTV dramas released in 2024.

←2023 – 2024 – 2025→

== VTV1 Weeknight Prime-time dramas ==
These dramas air from 21:00 to 21:30, Monday to Friday on VTV1.

- Note: From 5 to 15 Mar, the time slot was followed by 2021 Tet drama Yêu hơn cả bầu trời re-release version (adjusted from 4 original episodes to 9 episodes).

Broadcast	Title	Eps.	Prod.	Cast and crew	Theme song(s)	Genre	Notes
18 Mar–21 May; Playback: 26 Dec 2025–2 Feb 2026 (VTV1)	Lỡ hẹn với ngày xanh (Miss the Date with a Nice Day)	44 (30′); Replay: 25 (50′)	VFC	Trần Hoài Sơn (director); Chu Hồng Vân, Chu Hà Linh (writers); Hoàng Vân Anh (editor); Huỳnh Anh, Lê Xuân Anh, Minh Thu, Nguyễn Thanh Tuấn, Trịnh Mai Nguyên, Quách Thu Phương, Ngọc Tản, Hà Đan, Lâm Đức Anh, Thanh Huyền, Danh Thái, Bích Lan, Thiên Kiều, Diễm Hằng, Nguyễn Thị Mai Huê, Hải Như... / Trần Bảo Nam, Lan Anh		Drama, Romance, Office, Slice-of-Life	Delayed 3 eps on 17, 26 Apr and 6 May. Formerly: Nơi chúng ta thuộc về (Where We Belong)
22 May–27 Aug; Playback: 9 Jun–20 Jul 2026 (VTV10)	Những nẻo đường gần xa (Every Road Near and Far)	65 (30′); Replay: 39 (45′)	VFC	Nguyễn Mai Hiền (director); Trịnh Cẩm Hằng, Trịnh Đan Phượng (writers); Trịnh Khánh Hà (editor); Vĩnh Xương, Ngô Minh Hoàng, Trần Việt Hoàng, Trần Trung Kiên, Cù Thị Trà, Việt Anh, Nguyễn Bích Thủy, Nguyệt Hằng, Thanh Dương, Đình Chiến, Ngọc Thoa, Phú Kiên, Đỗ Kỷ, Văn Hát, Ngân Hoa, Thái An, Đào Thanh Mai, Hà Việt Dũng, Bảo Anh, Huyền Trang, Doãn Quốc Đam, Phương My, Nguyễn Thị Nguyệt, Lâm Đức Anh, Trang Emma, Hoàng Hải Thu, Huyền Sâm, Tiến Ngọc, Kim Dung, Minh Nguyệt, Quang Lâm, Nam Việt, Nguyễn Thị Mai Huê, Hoàng Khánh Ly, Lê Tuấn Thành, Sỹ Lâm, Lê Anh Trình, Trần Đức Sơn... Cameo: Thùy Linh	Học cách thương một người (Learn To Loves Someone) by Bằng Kiều, Phượng Vũ Giấc mơ từ hôm qua (Dream From Yesterday) by Bằng Kiều Lời nói là nhói đau (Words Are Painful) by Hồng Dương, Thanh Hương	Youth, Drama, Romance, Slice-of-Life, Sport	Delayed 5 eps on 31 May, 7 and 21 Jun, 25-26 Jul. Formerly: Chân trời rất xanh (Horizon Very Blue)
28 Aug–22 Nov; Playback: 27 Oct–25 Dec 2025 (VTV1)	Hoa sữa về trong gió (Milk Flowers in The Wind)	56 (30′); Replay: 35 (50′)	VFC	Bùi Tiến Huy (director); Đỗ Hương Anh, Đặng Thiếu Ngân, Chu Thị Hồng Vân, Chu Hà Linh (writers) Hoàng Vân Anh (editor); Thanh Quý, Bá Anh, Thanh Hương, Ngọc Quỳnh, Huyền Sâm, Tú Oanh, Võ Hoài Anh, Chu Diệp Anh, Đỗ Thế Gia Long, Tiến Đạt, Vũ Thanh Tú, Ngọc Thu, Việt Thắng, Phú Thăng, Trương Thu Hà, Phương Hạnh, Hoàng Huy, Phạm Minh Nguyệt, Sỹ Hưng, Diệp Bích, Hàn Trang, Thanh Dương, Thanh Tùng, Hương Linh, Lương Ngọc Dung, Phùng Khánh Linh, Tiến Ngọc, Bá Phong, Kim Ngân, Lan Anh, Nguyễn Tiến Việt, Trần Trung Kiên, Lê Anh Trình... / Khuất Quỳnh Hoa, Bùi Vũ Phong, Chu Quỳnh Chi, Khánh An	Nếu buồn, hãy buồn ở Hà Nội (If You Sad, Be Sad in Hà Nội) by Dương Trường Giang ft. Nguyễn Việt Hùng	Family, Slice-of-Life, Drama	Delayed 6 eps on 30 Aug, 10 & 14, 22 Oct and 4 & 15 Nov. Formerly: Chung một mái nhà (Share A Roof)
25 Nov 2024–14 Mar 2025; Playback: 22 Apr–23 May 2026 (VTV2)	Không thời gian (Timeless)	60 (30′); Replay: 32 (50')	VFC	Nguyễn Danh Dũng, Nguyễn Đức Hiếu (directors); Trịnh Khánh Hà, Huyền Lê (writers); Phạm Ngọc Hà Lê (editor); Mạnh Trường, Lê Xuân Anh, Lưu Duy Khánh, Chí Nhân, Như Quỳnh, Trung Anh, Bùi Xuân Thảo, Quốc Trị, Bích Ngọc, Bùi Thạc Phong, Hoàng Triều Dương, Huyền Sâm, Tô Dũng, Hoàng Công, Phú Kiên, Sùng Lãm, Anh Tuấn, Ngọc Thư, Trung Đức, Ngô Minh Hoàng, Chu Anh Tuấn, Thanh Hà, Yến My, Kim Huyền, Hoa Thúy, Phương Thảo, Minh Sìn, Trần Vân, Sỹ Toàn, Đào Nguyễn Ánh, Linh Huệ... / Trần Việt Hoàng, Phùng Đức Hiếu, Thừa Tuấn Anh, Trang Emma, Mạnh Hưng... Cameo: Doãn Quốc Đam	Kỷ niệm mối tình đầu (Memory of the First Love) by Vũ Thắng Lợi Nối vòng tay lớn (Great Circle of Vietnam); A version by Trương Trần Anh Duy & Leo-G	Drama, Crime, Political, Action, War	Delayed 19 eps on Nov 28, Dec 2, Dec 4–5, Dec 31 2024, Jan 1, Jan 9, Jan 20, Jan 22–23, Jan 27–31, Feb 3, Feb 26, 10 Mar 2025. Celebrating the 80th anniversary of Vietnam People's Army Formerly: Câu chuyện quá khứ (Past Story)

== VTV3 Weeknight Prime-time dramas ==
=== First line-up ===
The drama time slot is renewed and returned after a 7-month hiatus. These dramas air from 20:00 to 20:30, Monday to Friday on VTV3.

Broadcast	Title	Eps.	Prod.	Cast and crew	Theme song(s)	Genre	Notes
4 Mar–30 Jul	Mình yêu nhau, bình yên thôi (Let's Love, Peacefully)	105	SK Pictures	Lê Đỗ Ngọc Linh (director); Thiên Di, Tiết Kim Oanh, Mai Búp (writers); Thanh Sơn, Việt Hoa, Trọng Lân, Maya, Doãn Quốc Đam, Trình Mỹ Duyên, Tú Oanh, Hằng Nga, Vân Anh, Quỳnh Dương, Lưu Duy Khánh, Châu Dương, Hoàng Triều Dương, Vi Thường, Trần Chiến, Phương Linh... Cameo: Duy Hưng	Bức tranh tình yêu (A Picture of Love) by Phan Tuấn & Hiếu Jim	Drama, Romance, Marriage, Slice-of-Life	Delays 2 eps on 25-26 Jul due to National Mourning. Formerly: Những ô cửa trong thành phố (Windows in the City)
31 Jul–18 Oct	Đi giữa trời rực rỡ (Walking Under the Bright Sky): Part 1 -	58	SK Pictures	Đỗ Thanh Sơn (director); Nguyễn Ngọc Quỳnh Chi, Lê Hải Anh (writers); Lương Thu Hà, Nguyễn Long Vũ, Vương Anh, Võ Hoài Vũ, Hoàng Khánh Ly, Yên Đan, Hoàng Hải, Đức Khuê, Quỳnh Châu, Nguyễn Thùy Dương, Minh Hải, Vân Anh, Hoàng Xuân, Việt Pháp, Trường Sơn, Phương My...	Đi giữa trời rực rỡ (Walking Under the Bright Sky) by Ngô Lan Hương	Youth, Drama, Romance, Ethnic	Formerly: Đi về phía mặt trời (Go Towards the Sun)
21 Oct 2024–3 Jan 2025	Tuổi trẻ giá bao nhiêu? (How Much is Youth Worth?)	55	SK Pictures	Nguyễn Đức Nhật Thanh (director); F35 Story (writers); Đoàn Thế Vinh, Ngô Hải Nam, Trương Quốc Bảo, Lương Ánh Ngọc, Ngân Hòa, Nhung Gumiho, Công Ninh, Huỳnh Anh Tuấn, Huỳnh Trang Nhi, Châu Hà Yến Nhi...	Hành trình tuổi trẻ (The Journey of Youth) by StillaD	Drama, Romance, Youth	

=== Second line-up ===
==== Monday-Wednesday dramas ====
- This is the last TV series produced by VFC and broadcast in the prime time slot of 21:40 (Monday to Friday).

These dramas air from 21:40 to 22:30, Monday to Wednesday on VTV3.

Broadcast	Title	Eps.	Prod.	Cast and crew	Theme song(s)	Genre	Notes
11 Mar–3 Jul	Trạm cứu hộ trái tim (Heart Rescue Station)	51	VFC	Vũ Trường Khoa (director); Nguyễn Thu Thủy, Nguyễn Nhiệm, Thùy Dương, Lương Ly, Đỗ Lê (writers); Hồng Diễm, Quang Sự, Trương Thanh Long, Lương Thu Trang, Đồng Thu Hà, Phạm Cường, Mỹ Uyên, Thúy Diễm, Vũ Tuấn Việt, Thu Quế, Thu Hương, Công Lý, Tú An, Trần Bảo Nam, Đặng Trí Đức, Ngô Thu Hương, Vương Trọng Trí, Uy Linh, Đức Hùng, Nguyễn Mạnh Cường... / Kiều Anh, Hồng Ngọc, Linh Chi, Ngọc Mạnh, Trần Việt Hoàng, Phương Trang, Bùi Như Quỳnh, Lương Ngọc Dung, Chu Diệp Anh	Ai rồi cũng sẽ khác (Everybody Changes) by Hà Nhi Đừng im lặng nữa (Don't Be Silent Anymore) by Thu Ba	Drama, Marriage, Family	
8 Jul–28 Aug	Vui lên nào! Anh em ơi (Cheer Up, Brothers!)	21	VFC	Vũ Minh Trí (director); Ngô Tuấn Dương, Nguyễn Thu Trang, Hà Thu Hà (writers); Dương Anh Đức, Thái Sơn, Tô Dũng, Hương Giang, Thạch Thu Huyền, Anh Đào, Nguyễn Hoàng Ngọc Huyền, Linh Huệ, Đức Khuê, Ngọc Tản, Hồng Hạnh, Thanh Tú, Nguyễn Thanh Bình, Anh Tuấn, Phú Kiên, Đình Chiến, Hồ Liên, Điền Viên, Lý Chí Huy, Hà Anh, Ngô Quân Anh, Tiến Huy...	Vui lên nào! Anh em ơi (Cheer Up, Brothers!) by Minh Vương	Comedy, Slice-of-Life, Rural, Drama	Delay 3 eps on 22-24 Jul due to National Mourning. Formerly: Những kẻ mộng mơ (Bunch of Dreamers)
2 Sep–20 Nov	Cảnh sát hình sự: Độc đạo (Criminal Police: The Only Way)	36	VFC	Phạm Gia Phương, Trần Trọng Khôi (directors); Phạm Đình Hải, Vũ Liêm (writers); Nguyễn Trung Dũng (editor); Doãn Quốc Đam, Duy Hưng, Hoàng Hải, Nguyệt Hằng, Hồ Phong, Vĩnh Xương, Chí Trung, Hà Việt Dũng, Bảo Anh, Việt Hoa, Đỗ Duy Nam, Hà Trung, Phạm Tuấn Anh, Thanh Huế, Nguyễn Mạnh Cường, Tô Dũng, Bùi Bài Bình, Bá Anh, Thu Huyền, Phú Kiên, Hoàng Công, Trương Hoàng, Minh Cúc, Tạ Vũ Thu, Phạm Tất Thành, Nông Dũng Nam, Tuấn Vũ, Huyền Sâm, Nguyễn Tú, Trần Hoàng Nhật, Quốc Quân, Chu Mạnh Cường...	Linh hồn và thể xác (The Soul and the Body) by Nguyễn Hải Phong	Drama, Crime, Family, Thriller, Comedy	Based on Colombian drama One Way Out (Caracol Televisión, 2019)
25 Nov 2024–12 Feb 2025	Followed by the re-release ver. of Mẹ ác ma, cha thiên sứ (Evil Mom, Angelic Dad), adjusted from original 22 eps to 33 eps. The drama was original produced by K+ and first released on K+CINE channel from Dec 2021 to Mar 2022. Note: Based on Chinese drama series Tiger Mom (Dragon TV, 2015). Delayed eps on 27-29 Jan due to Tet holiday.						

==== Thursday-Friday dramas ====
These dramas air from 21:40 to 22:30, Thursday and Friday on VTV3.

Broadcast	Title	Eps.	Prod.	Cast and crew	Theme song(s)	Genre	Notes
25 Jan–22 Mar	Gặp em ngày nắng (Meet You on a Sunny Day)	16	VFC	Nguyễn Đức Hiếu (director); Lại Phương Thảo, Chu Hồng Vân (writers); Đình Tú, Anh Đào, Thanh Quý, Lan Hương 'Bông', Vũ Thanh Tú, Quốc Trị, Yến My, Trần Trung Kiên, Mai Hương, Việt Thắng, Xuân Trường, An Chinh, Lưu Huyền Trang, Tiến Huy, Bùi Gia Nghĩa, Cù Thị Trà, Vũ Mai Huê, Nguyễn Tiến Quang, Quốc Huy, Diệp Bích, Tú Lan, Ngọc Vân... Cameo: Trọng Lân, Ngô Minh Hoàng	Ôi mất rìu (Oh My Heart) by Thế Anh Shinichi ft. Puddingiln	Romance, Comedy, Family, Slice-of-Life	Produced as a Tết drama. Delayed 2 eps on 8-9 Feb due to Tet holiday. Formerly: Tia nắng của mùa xuân (Spring Sunray)
28 Mar–21 Jun	Người một nhà (As a Family)	26	VFC	Trịnh Lê Phong (director); Lê Huyền (writer); Duy Hưng, Tuấn Tú, Vân Dung, Thanh Hương, Quỳnh Châu, Hà Việt Dũng, Trần Quốc Trọng, Gia Linh, Hồng Liên, Hoàng Du Ka, Phạm Tuấn Anh, Hoàng Huy, Trần Bảo Nam, Nguyễn Tú, Tiến Việt, Tiến Ngọc, Bích Thủy...	Vô tư (Carefree) by Anh Quân Idol	Family, Drama, Slice-of-Life, Crime	Formerly: Nhà có 2 anh em (Family of 2 Brothers)
27 Jun–1 Nov	Sao Kim bắn tim sao Hỏa (Venus Shoots Heart to Mars)	36	VFC	Bùi Quốc Việt (director); Lại Phương Thảo, Tiết Kim Oanh, Mai Búp (writers); Mạnh Quân, Diễm Hằng, Quang Minh, Minh Thu, Tiến Lộc, Bích Ngọc, Minh Cúc, Phú Đôn, Huỳnh Hồng Loan, Lý Chí Huy, Hoàng Linh Chi, Bảo Anh, Nguyễn Thanh Bình, Trần Vân, Hàn Trang, Hồng Liên, Nguyễn Bùi Thái Hoàng, Nguyễn Hoàng Diệp, Đỗ Phương Vy, Nguyễn Ánh Diệp, Trần Đoàn, Bích Diệp, Nguyễn Ngọc Thủy, Hoàng Chúc...	Em không được phép buồn rầu (You're not Allowed to be Sad) by kis Lần đầu tiên (The First Time) by Emcee L ft. Muộii	Comedy, Marriage, Drama, Romance	Delays 2 eps on 25-26 Jul due to National Mourning. Book Men Are from Mars, Women Are from Venus to John Gray. Formerly: Chồng nhà người ta (Someone's Husband)
7 Nov–6 Dec	Followed by the playback of Đi về phía lửa (Towards the Fire), 10 episodes. The drama was original produced by K+ and first released on K+CINE channel in Feb-Mar 2024. Note: Based on Taiwanese firefighter-themed drama series Tears on Fire (PTS, 2021).						
12 Dec 2024–14 Feb 2025	Followed by the re-release ver. of Nhà mình lạ lắm! (My Family is Weird!), adjusted from original 12 eps to 18 eps. The drama was original produced by K+ and first released on K+CINE channel in Jul 2023. Note: Based on Korean drama series Bad Family (SBS, 2006). Delayed 2 eps on 30-31 Jan due to Tet holiday.						

== See also ==
- List of dramas broadcast by Vietnam Television (VTV)
- List of dramas broadcast by Hanoi Radio Television (HanoiTV)
- List of dramas broadcast by Vietnam Digital Television (VTC)
