= The Arbitrator =

The Arbitrator may refer to:

- Arbitrator, a person chosen to resolve a dispute by way of arbitration
- The Arbitrator (Israeli TV series), a 2007 Israeli drama series
- The Arbitrator (Vietnamese TV series), a 2017 Vietnamese drama series
