= Ho Chi Minh in Siam =

- Official poster
- Directed by: Bui Tuan Dung
- Written by: Dinh Thien Phuc
- Produced by: Hoda Film
- Starring: Mạnh Trường; Hoàng Hải; Bùi Trung Anh; Huyền Sâm; Nguyễn Mạnh Hưng; Văn Phượng
- Cinematography: Ly Thai Dung
- Music by: Hoang Luong
- Release date: 2015
- Running time: 96 minutes
- Country: Vietnam
- Language: Vietnamese

Ho Chi Minh in Siam (Vietnamese: Thầu Chín Ở Xiêm) is a 2015 Vietnamese film directed by Bui Tuan Dung. The film was written by Dinh Thien Phuc, its music was composed by Hoang Luong, and it was produced by Hoda Film.

== Plot ==
The story start in 1927 Vietnam, where leader Ho Chi Minh journeys from Bangkok to Udon Thani, a province in northeastern of Thailand.

== Cast ==
- Manh Truong as Thau Chin
- Hoang Hai as Paul Hung
- Bui Trung Anh as Dang Thuc Hua
- Huyen Sam as Dang Quynh Anh
- Van Phuong as Nho
