= The Only Way (Vietnamese TV series) =

- Genre: Criminal; Family; Social Psychology; Horror; Comedy
- Based on: One Way Out (2019)
- Written by: Phạm Đình Hải; Vũ Liêm
- Directed by: Phạm Gia Phương; Trần Trọng Khôi
- Starring: Doãn Quốc Đam; Nguyễn Duy Hưng; Hoàng Hải; Cao Nguyệt Hằng; Hồ Phong; Phạm Chí Trung; Nguyễn Vĩnh Xương; Phạm Bảo Anh; Hà Việt Dũng; Đỗ Duy Nam; Vũ Việt Hoa; Nguyễn Hà Trung; Nguyễn Thị Thanh Huế; Nguyễn Mạnh Cường; Bùi Bài Bình
- Music by: Linh hồn và thể xác (Body and Soul)
- Country of origin: Vietnam
- Original language: Vietnamese

Production
- Producer: Trần Kim Vũ
- Cinematography: Đỗ Trung Quân; Nguyễn Hoàng Anh
- Editor: Nguyễn Trung Dũng
- Running time: 45 – 50 minutes/episode (does not include ads)
- Production companies: Vietnam Television Film Center, Vietnam Television

Original release
- Network: VTV3
- Release: 2 September – 20 November 2024

Độc đạo (The Only Way) is a television series in the Criminal Police series, produced by Vietnam Television Film Center, Vietnam Television, directed by Phạm Gia Phương and Trần Trọng Khôi. The series was purchased based on the script of the 2019 Colombian TV series One Way Out. (Note: The series was produced by Caracol Televisión.) The series airs at 9:40 p.m from Monday to Wednesday every week, starting from September 2, 2024, on VTV3.

== Plot ==
The series revolves around the story of Lê Vũ Hồng - a young man with great pain, losing both his father and mother and his only relative, his younger brother. Hồng later became a homeless child, taken home by Mrs. Mộc, the second wife of Lê Toàn - a retired mafia boss - to take care of. There was a special connection between Hồng and Khương, Toàn's illegitimate child, which made Toàn decide to adopt Hồng. Not only that, Toàn also trusted and chose Hồng to run the Lê family's business. However, that trust and nurturing did not make Hồng forget the pain of losing his loved one in the past. He followed the clues to find the truth about his parents' death and learned about his adoptive father's relationship with three trusted juniors at that time, including Quân "old", Hưng "Khẹc" and Dương "muscle". Apart from Lê Toàn who has retired, the remaining three are all notorious transnational narcotics lords with headquarters in Mây Village, and any one of them could be the one who brought tragedy to Hồng's family. While Hồng followed the lords to find answers, he did not know that all of his actions as well as his group of criminals were under the police's surveillance. Senior Colonel Lê Hoàng Long – Head of the Narcotics Crime Investigation Department of Province Police – was transferred to support Senior Colonel Dương Công Phùng – Head of the District Police, who is also Long's long-time friend...

== Selected cast ==
- Doãn Quốc Đam as Lê Vũ Hồng
- Nguyễn Duy Hưng as Lê Khương (Khương "Daring")
- Hoàng Hải as Lê Toàn
- Cao Nguyệt Hằng as Mrs Mộc, Lê Toàn's wife
- Hồ Phong as Trương Văn Dương (Dương "Muscle")
- Nguyễn Vĩnh Xương as Phạm Quân (Quân "old")
- Chí Trung as Đặng Bá Hưng (Hưng "Khẹc")
- Phạm Bảo Anh as Police Senior Colonel Dương Công Phùng
- Hà Việt Dũng as Police Senior Colonel Lê Hoàng Long
- Đỗ Duy Nam as Đặng Bá Tân (Tân "Crown Prince")
- Vũ Việt Hoa as Nguyễn Phương Diễm
- Nguyễn Hà Trung as Lý "Toét"/Lulu
- Bùi Bài Bình as Tráng A Cừ
- Nguyễn Thị Thanh Huế as Tuyết
- Nguyễn Mạnh Cường as Dũng "Glasses"
- Phạm Tuấn Anh as Tuấn
- Đặng Minh Cúc as Ly
- Nguyễn Phú Kiên as Khoa
- Hoàng Chí Công as Police Colonel Lâm Minh Hải
- Lê Bá Anh as Trình
- Huyền Sâm as Trâm
- Nông Dũng Nam as Vĩnh
- Quốc Quân as Quản "sòi"
- Trương Hoàng as Police officer Nghĩa (K3)
- Tô Dũng as Phan Hồng Thanh
- Tạ Vũ Thu as Tuấn "iron"
- Nguyễn Tú as Police Captain Quốc
- Tuấn Vũ as Lợi
- Phạm Tất Thành as Hoàng Việt Tiến (Tiến "Sniper")
- Chu Mạnh Cường (Cường "Fish") as Private driver of Quân "old"
