= Timeless (Vietnamese TV series) =

- Không thời gian
- Genre: Politics; War; Criminal; Social psychology
- Written by: Trịnh Khánh Hà; Lê Huyền; Phạm Ngọc Hà Lê
- Directed by: Nguyễn Danh Dũng; Nguyễn Đức Hiếu
- Starring: Mạnh Trường; Lê Xuân Anh; Đào Chí Nhân; Lưu Duy Khánh; Nguyễn Quốc Trị; Bùi Trung Anh; Nguyễn Như Quỳnh; Bùi Xuân Thảo; Phùng Đức Hiếu; Trần Việt Hoàng; Nguyễn Huyền Trang; Thừa Tuấn Anh; Doãn Quốc Đam; Phạm Thị Bích Ngọc; Bùi Thạc Phong; Phạm Anh Tuấn
- Theme music composer: "Nối vòng tay lớn"
- Country of origin: Vietnam
- Original language: Vietnamese
- No. of episodes: 60

Production
- Production location: Vietnam
- Running time: 20-25 minutes/episode
- Production company: Vietnam Television Film Center

Original release
- Network: VTV
- Release: 25 November 2024 – 14 March 2025

Không thời gian (Timeless) is a TV series produced by Vietnam Television Film Center, Vietnam Television and General Department of Politics of the Vietnam People's Army, directed by Nguyễn Danh Dũng. The series airs at 9:00 p.m from Monday to Friday every week starting from November 25, 2024, and ending on March 14, 2025, on channel VTV1.

== Plot ==
Timeless revolves around the story of Army Lieutenant Colonel Lê Nguyên Đại and his comrades. They are peacetime soldiers with patriotism, courage and the spirit of completing any mission and overcoming any difficulty. They are people who never falter in the face of danger, ready to sacrifice themselves to protect people's lives from natural disasters and epidemics. Those people have a compassionate heart, share and sympathize with every difficulty and hardship of their compatriots, but are extremely resourceful, decisive and steadfast when facing enemies with sophisticated tricks, taking advantage of people's trust to propagate against the Party and State's policies. With their hearts turned towards the people, peacetime soldiers always put the interests of the people first, because they understand that people's trust and affection are the strong motivation that helps soldiers overcome all challenges.

== Cast ==
- Mạnh Trường as Lieutenant Colonel Lê Nguyên Đại
- Lê Xuân Anh as Teacher Tâm
- Đào Chí Nhân as Đào Chí Tài
- Lưu Duy Khánh as Army Captain Trần Hùng
- Nguyễn Quốc Trị as Mr Lê Văn Nậm
  - Phùng Đức Hiếu as Nậm (young)
- Bùi Trung Anh as Mr Trần Văn Cường
  - Trần Việt Hoàng as Cường (young)
- Nguyễn Như Quỳnh as Mrs Hà Thị Hồi
  - Nguyễn Huyền Trang (Trang Emma) as Hồi (young)
- Bùi Xuân Thảo as Mr Hoàng Đình Quý
  - Thừa Tuấn Anh as Quý (young)
- Phạm Thị Bích Ngọc as Lieutenant Nguyễn Hạ Miên
- Bùi Thạc Phong as First Soldier Nguyễn Đức Lĩnh
- Hoàng Dương as First Soldier Trần Duy Huy
- Ngô Minh Hoàng as Corporal Dương Văn Linh
- Phạm Anh Tuấn as Vừ A Lãm
- Nguyễn Ngọc Thư as Mrs Phỉu Khèn
- Hoàng Chí Công as Colonel Hoàng Quân
- Nguyễn Phú Kiên as Major General Lê Nam
- Tô Tuấn Dũng as Border Guard Major Colonel Lý Minh Thắng
- Đỗ Hoa Thúy trong vai Nguyễn Hoa Trạm
- Nguyễn Mạnh Hưng as Khải
- Kim Huyền as Nhớ
- Yến My as Hạnh
- Hoàng Thị Diệu Linh as Thương
- Trần Vân as Phìn Hoa
- Trung Đức as Giàng Bá Lâm (K9 Army reconnaissance)
- Đào Nguyễn Ánh as Lầu Minh Vương
- Sỹ Toàn as Hạ Dũng Pê (Philip Hạ)
- Doãn Quốc Đam as Infirmary army guard
- Linh Huệ as Lĩnh s' mother
