= Hà Việt Dũng =

Vietnamese model and actor

Ha Viet Dung
- Born: August 19, 1987 (age 38); Tân Lạc, Hòa Bình, Vietnam
- Occupations: Actor; Model
- Years active: 2011–present
- Height: 185 m (606 ft 11 in)

Hà Việt Dũng (born August 19, 1987) is a Vietnamese model and actor. Originally a model when he won the bronze medal of Vietnam Supermodel 2011, Ha Viet Dung entered the field of television drama and made an impression through the films Ngược chiều nước mắt (Against the tide of tears), Lựa chọn số phận (Choosing fate), Hãy nói lời yêu (Say words of love), Anh có phải đàn ông không (Are you a man) and Bão ngầm (Understorm).

== Biography ==
Ha Viet Dung was born in Muong Khen town (now Man Duc town), Tan Lac district, Hoa Binh province in a farmer family with three sisters, he was the youngest. He had a difficult childhood when he worked with his mother at a brick kiln. After finishing high school, due to difficult circumstances, he didn't register for the university entrance exam but joined the military service. After being discharged from the army, he officially lived in Ho Chi Minh City to make a living by selling sugarcane juice. Thanks to his tall figure, he became a model and won bronze at the Vietnam Supermodel contest 2011.

He then moved into the film industry and had initial success with his debut role in the film Cold Summer (Mùa hè lạnh).

== Personal life ==
Ha Viet Dung got married in October 2018 after a few months of dating. His wife, Ha Nhung, was born in 1993 and they have a daughter.

== Works participated ==
=== Music video ===
Year	Song	Singer
2013	Hãy mặc em đi	Hồ Ngọc Hà
2014	Đừng buông tay em mà	Maya
2015	Giây phút cuối	Giang Hồng Ngọc
2017	Chờ người	Tố My
2021	Mời anh về thăm xứ Nghệ	Lương Nguyệt Anh

=== Movie ===
Year	Movie Title	Role	Film Director	Source
2012	Mùa hè lạnh	Kiên	Ngô Quang Hải	
2013	Hoàng tử và lọ lem		Ngô Quang Hải	
2014	Hương ga		Ngô Quốc Cường	
2015	Ma dai	Vĩnh	Đỗ Đức Thịnh, Nguyễn Hoàng Duy	
2015	Bảo mẫu siêu quậy		Lê Bảo Trung	
2016	Vệ sĩ, tiểu thư và thằng khờ		Việt Anh	
2016	Truy sát		Ngô Quốc Cường	
2016	Phim trường ma		Vũ Thái Hòa	
2017	Anh em siêu quậy		Lê Bảo Trung	
2020	Tiền nhiều để làm gì?	Hùng	Lưu Huỳnh	
2022	Người tình		Lưu Huỳnh	

=== TV Series ===
Year	Title	Role	Film Director	Channel	Source
2011	Nữ vệ sĩ	Hiếu	Hồng Ngân	HTV9	
2012	Tiếng đàn kìm	Thái Tân	Đỗ Thành An	SCTV7	
2013	Ranh giới mong manh	Phi	Nguyễn Mạnh Hà	HTV9	
2014	Chiến dịch chống ế	Cu Bin	Đinh Hà Uyên Thư	VTV9	
2015	Người đứng trong gió	Đông Phong	Bùi Nam Yên	VTV3	
2015	Như khúc tình ca	Quang Hiền	Vương Quang Hùng	HTV7	
2016	Đồng tiền quỷ ám	Huỳnh Bảo Lâm	Trần Chí Thành	VTV1	
2016	Sếp ơi anh yêu em	Danh	Nguyễn Mạnh Hà	SCTV14	
2017	Màu thứ 8 của tình yêu	Khang	Nguyễn Mạnh Hà	SCTV14	
2017	Những sắc màu hôn nhân	Hoàng	Nguyễn Anh Tuấn	HTV9	
2017	Ngược chiều nước mắt	Sơn	Vũ Minh Trí	VTV1	
2017	Em ơi anh đây mà	Quang	Trần Bắc	SCTV14	
2018	Mộng phù hoa	Long	Bùi Nam Yên, Trần Quế Ngọc	VTV3	
2018	Kẻ ngược dòng	Bảy Dũng	Nguyễn Duy Võ Ngọc	VTV1/VTV9	
2020	Lựa chọn số phận	Judge Trần Hùng Cường	Mai Hồng Phong, Bùi Quốc Việt	VTV1	
2021	Hãy nói lời yêu	Khắc Bình	Bùi Quốc Việt	VTV3	
2022	Anh có phải đàn ông không	Nhật Minh	Trịnh Lê Phong	VTV3	
2022	Bão ngầm	Police Captain, Major Colonel Đào Hải Triều, Hùng "nhọ"	Đinh Thái Thụy	VTV1	
2022	Hành trình công lý	Trịnh Tuấn Hùng	Nguyễn Mai Hiền	VTV3	
2023	Đừng nói khi yêu	Quy	Bùi Tiến Huy	VTV3	Guest
2023	Cuộc chiến không giới tuyến	Mai Văn Đoàn	Nguyễn Danh Dũng	VTV1	
2023	Đội điều tra số 7	Police Major Hoàng Viết Danh	Mai Hồng Phong, Triệu Hoài Nam	ANTV	Main role
2024	Người một nhà	Khải	Trịnh Lê Phong	VTV3	
2024	Những nẻo đường gần xa	Khoa	Nguyễn Mai Hiền	VTV1	Supporting role
2024	Độc đạo	Police Colonel Lê Hoàng Long	Phạm Gia Phương; Trần Trọng Khôi	VTV3	
