= Father's Gift =

- Genre: Romance film Family; Affection; Drama film Humour; Psychosocial
- Written by: Nguyễn Ngọc Quỳnh Chi; Đặng Thu Hà; Hiểu Anh
- Directed by: Vũ Minh Trí
- Voices of: Võ Hoài Nam; Minh Hòa; Tuấn Tú; Hương Giang; Nguyễn Ngọc Huyền; Lưu Duy Khánh
- Music by: Mong ước cho con Ave Maria; Gió gánh đò đưa Cha và con gái Sẽ mãi một tình yêu
- Country of origin: Vietnam
- Original language: Vietnamese
- No. of episodes: 21

Production
- Cinematography: Dương Tuấn Anh
- Running time: 45 – 50 minutes/episode (not including ads)
- Production companies: Vietnam Television Film Center; Vietnam Television

Original release
- Network: VTV3
- Release: July 17 – August 30, 2023

Father's Gift (Vietnamese: Món quà của cha) is a Vietnamese television series. The television its premiered on 9:40 p.m. every Monday, Tuesday and Wednesday starting on July 17, 2023, and ended on August 30, 2023 on VTV3.

== Main casts ==
- Võ Hoài Nam as Mr. Nhan
- Minh Hòa as Mrs. Thuy
- Tuan Tu as Trong Nghia
- Nguyen Huong Giang as Quyen
- Nguyen Ngoc Huyen as Dieu Thao
- Luu Duy Khanh as Trong Hieu

== Supporting casts ==
- Thanh Tú as Ms. Thản
- Phạm Anh Tuấn as Dung's husband
- Hoàng Huy as Mr. Cung
- Lương Thu Hà as Ninh
- Nguyễn Quỳnh Trang as Ngọc
- Vũ Hồng Thái as Phi
- Trúc Quỳnh as Dung
- Dương Anh Đức as Bo
- Trần Quốc Anh (B Trần) as Phúc
- Đào Trúc Mai as Ms. Nguyệt
- Minh Thu as Hải Ly
- Hải Ly as Oanh
- Tiến Ngọc as Hưng
- Hàn Trang as Diệu Anh
- Mai Huê as Yến
- Lâm Đức Anh as Báu
- Thái Dương as Realtor
- Nguyễn Bảo Linh as Ân
- Nguyễn Ngọc An Nhiên as Bông
- Kim Ngân as Nga
- Thủy Tiên as Béo
- Nguyễn Huy as Mượt
- Mai Mạnh as Còi
- Phương Hạnh as Phi's mother

Along with some other actors...

== Soundtrack ==
- Wishes for You (Vietnamese: Mong ước cho con)

Composed: Trần Quang Duy
Show: Lan Quỳnh

- Ave Maria

Composed: Franz Schubert
Show: Lan Quỳnh

- Gió đánh đò đưa

Composed: Lan Quỳnh

- Father and Daughter (Vietnamese: Love Forever)

Composed: Nguyễn Văn Chung
Show: Lan Quỳnh

- Father and Daughter (Vietnamese: Sẽ mãi một tình yêu) (OST Hương vị tình thân)

Composed: Trần Quang Duy
Show: Minh Vương M4U
