= Như Quỳnh (actress) =

Vietnamese actress

People's Artist Nguyễn Như Quỳnh
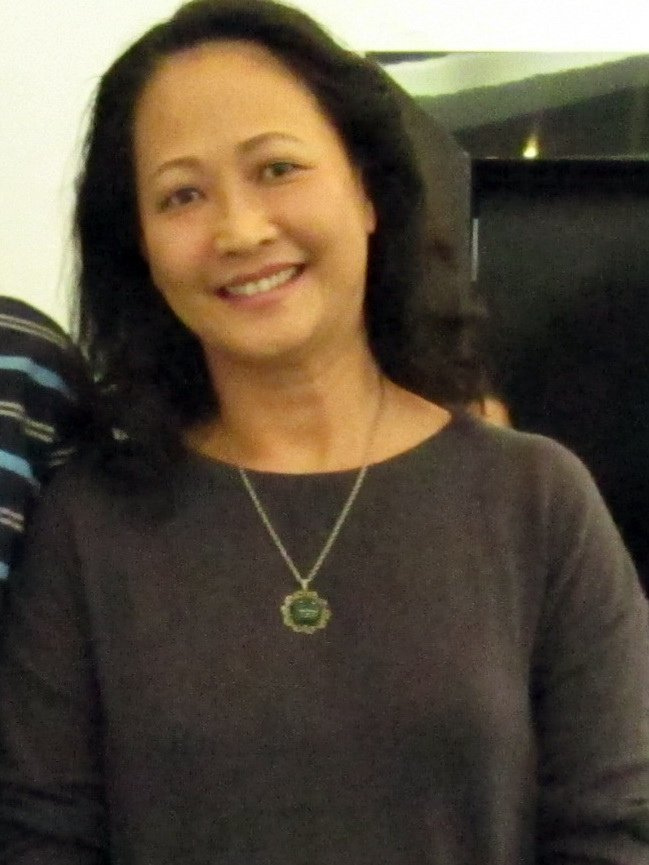
- Như Quỳnh in 2010
- Born: Nguyễn Như Quỳnh; May 10, 1954 (age 72); Hanoi, North Vietnam
- Education: Vietnam Film School
- Occupations: Actress; model
- Known for: Cinema; television; reformed
- Spouse: Nguyễn Hữu Bảo (m. 1980)
- Awards: Outstanding director Vietnam Film Festival; People's Artist (2007); Distinguished Artist (1988)

Nguyễn Như Quỳnh (born May 10, 1954) is a Vietnamese actress and People's Artist (NSND). She is also known as an amateur poet.

Nhu Quynh actor graduated in 1971 from the Vietnam Theatre School. Two years later, she acted as one of the two female leads in her first film, Bài ca ra trận (1973). Then with her role as the girl Nết in Đến hẹn lại lên (1974), Như Quỳnh won the Best Actress Award at the 3rd Vietnam Film Festival in 1975. Her roles in a series of French co-productions, Indochine (1992), Cyclo (1995) and Vertical Ray of the Sun (2000) introduced her to a foreign audience. In Cyclo Như Quỳnh plays the crime boss who extorts and entraps the young cyclo-taxi driver. In Vertical Ray of Light she plays the oldest of the three Hanoi sisters.

She is also the owner of Cafe Quynh in Hanoi's Bat Dan Street.

== Selected filmography ==
Year	Title	Director	Role
1973	''March to the Front''	NSND Trần Đắc	Mai
1974	''Đến hẹn lại lên'' shown in the Soviet Union as "We will meet again"	Trần Vũ	Nết
1976	Ngày lễ Thánh	NSND Bạch Diệp	Ái
1977	''Mối tình đầu'' "First Love" as leading role Diễm Hương	NSND Hải Ninh	Diễm Hương
1978	Hà Nội mùa chim làm tổ	NSƯT Đức Hoàn	Nguyệt
1978	Hi vọng cuối cùng	NSND Trần Phương	
	Duyên nợ	Nguyễn Hữu Luyện	Hiền
1984	Đêm miền yên tĩnh	NSND Trần Phương; Nguyễn Hữu Luyện	Chủ tịch huyện
1987	Số đỏ	NSƯT Hà Văn Trọng; Lộng Chương	Bà Văn Minh
1989	Gánh hàng hoa	NSND Trần Đắc	Cô Liên
1992	Indochine	Régis Wargnier	Cô Sao
1995	Cyclo	Trần Anh Hùng	
1995	Sông Hồng reo	Nguyễn Hữu Luyện, NSƯT Trần Trung Nhàn	Hạnh
1996	Bỏ trốn	NSND Phạm Nhuệ Giang	Bà Mai
1996	Nước mắt thời mở cửa	Lưu Trọng Ninh	Mẹ Trinh
1997	Tình nghĩa vợ chồng	Nguyễn Hữu Luyện	
2000	Mùa hè chiều thẳng đứng	Trần Anh Hùng	Chị Sương
2001	Bến không chồng	Lưu Trọng Ninh	
2004	Những cô gái chân dài	Vũ Ngọc Đãng	Mẹ nhân vật Ngọc
2005	Hạt mưa rơi bao lâu	Đoàn Minh Phượng	
2006	Chuyện của Pao	Ngô Quang Hải	Mẹ già
2006	Hai cô con gái của ông chủ vườn thuốc Trung Hoa	Đới Tư Kiệt	Bà giám đốc cô nhi viện
2006	Áo lụa Hà Đông	Lưu Huỳnh	Bà Phán
2007	Sài Gòn Nhật thực	Othello Khánh	Bà Tú
2007	Golden Bride	Woon Goon Il	Mẹ nhân vật Jin-ju
2009	Chơi vơi	Bùi Thạc Chuyên	Bà Thu
2010	Blog nàng dâu	NSƯT Mai Hồng Phong	Bà Loan
2011	Tháng củ mật	NSƯT Nguyễn Danh Dũng	Bà Hoà
2011	Làm bố thật tuyệt	Nguyễn Mạnh Hà	Bà Minh
2011	Lời nguyền huyết ngải ("Blood Curse")	Bùi Thạc Chuyên	Bà lão câm
2012	Những công dân tập thể	NSƯT Vũ Trường Khoa	Bà Mai
2012	Mặt nạ da người	NSƯT Mai Hồng Phong	Bà Trang
2012	Ông tơ hai phẩy	NSƯT Nguyễn Danh Dũng	Bà Phương
2015	Sóng ngầm	Nguyễn Mạnh Hà	Bà Mai
2015	Khép mắt chờ ngày mai	NSƯT Vũ Trường Khoa	Bà Mỹ
2015	Lời ru mùa đông	NSƯT Mai Hồng Phong	Bà Trương
2019	Người vợ ba	Nguyễn Phương Anh	Bà Vú
2020	Đừng bắt em phải quên	Vũ Minh Trí	Bà Dịu
2021	Hương vị tình thân	NSƯT Nguyễn Danh Dũng	Bà Dần
2022	Hành trình công lý	NSƯT Mai Hiền	Bà Giang
2023	Chạm vào hạnh phúc	Nguyễn Mai Long	Mẹ Bà Nhàn
2024	Không thời gian	Nguyễn Danh Dũng	Bà Hồi
