= Saigon Eclipse =

2007 film directed by Othello Khanh

- Directed by: Othello Khanh
- Written by: John Board; Othello Khanh; Bernard Leroy-Deval
- Starring: Dustin Nguyen; Trương Ngọc Ánh; Marjolaine Bui; Johnny Trí Nguyễn
- Release date: 2007
- Running time: 90 minutes
- Country: Vietnam
- Languages: English; Vietnamese

Saigon Eclipse (Sài Gòn nhật thực) is a 2007 Vietnamese film directed by Othello Khanh and starring Dustin Nguyen, Trương Ngọc Ánh, Marjolaine Bui, Johnny Trí Nguyễn, Như Quỳnh, Daniel You, Edmund Chen, and Joseph Chen Tseng. It is based on Nguyễn Du's epic poem, The Tale of Kiều.

== Plot ==
The story relates the destiny of a young, beautiful, and talented Vietnamese woman who sacrifices herself for her family. The film chronicles the fate of Kieu, who soon after her secret engagement, returns home to find her father is about to be imprisoned on trumped-up charges. Kieu offers herself in payment for her father's debt without fully understanding the ramifications of this decision. Du's poem was written as an allegory for Vietnam, which has often been possessed and abused by others.
