= Honored Artist of the RSFSR (visual arts) =

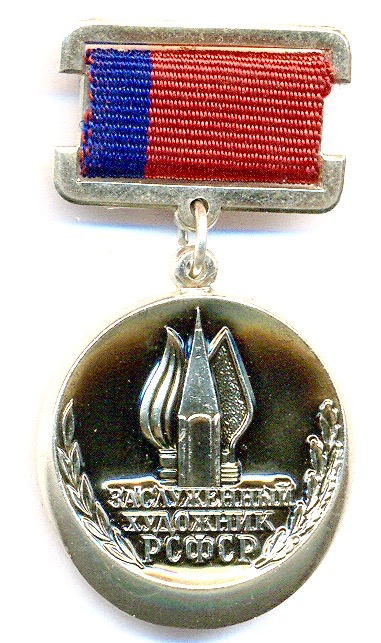
Honored Artist of the RSFSR medal

Honored Artist of the Russian Soviet Federated Socialist Republic (Russian:Заслуженный художник РСФСР) was an honorary title of the RSFSR.

The award was established on September 10, 1960 by the decree of the Presidium of the Supreme Soviet of the RSFSR "On the establishment of the honorary title of Honored Artist of the RSFSR".

It was awarded by the Presidium to highly professional artists who created works of painting, sculpture, graphics, monumental, decorative and applied, design, theater, film and television art, which received public recognition.

The recipient received a diploma of the Presidium and the corresponding badge, which was worn on the right side of the chest and was located below orders, medals and badges for honorary titles of the USSR.

The last assignments of the title took place on February 4, 1992.
