= The Arbitrator (Vietnamese TV series) =

Vietnamese crime drama series

- Also known as: Người phán xử
- Genre: Crime; Black comedy
- Created by: Reshef Levi; Shay Kanot
- Based on: The Arbitrator of Israel
- Written by: Nguyễn Trung Dũng; Bùi Minh Khánh
- Directed by: Nguyễn Mai Hiền; Nguyễn Khải Anh; Nguyễn Danh Dũng
- Starring: Hoàng Dũng; Việt Anh; Hồng Đăng
- Voices of: Đỗ Thanh Hải
- Theme music composer: Nguyễn Xuân Phương
- Country of origin: Vietnam
- Original languages: Vietnamese; American-English
- No. of episodes: 47 + 4

Production
- Producers: Đỗ Thanh Hải; Nguyễn Như Quỳnh
- Cinematography: Vũ Trung Kiên; Nguyễn Mạnh Hùng
- Editor: Trần Thục Uyên
- Running time: 50 minutes 30 minutes
- Production company: Vietnam Television Film Center

Original release
- Network: VTV3
- Release: 23 March – 31 August 2017

The Arbitrator (Vietnamese: Người phán xử) is a 2017 Vietnamese crime drama series, based on the Israel crime drama series The Arbitrator (Ha-Borer).

== Plot ==
- Part 1 : The Truthful Son (Đứa con chính trực)

From chap 1 to chap 26. The story of the journey to find the biological father of a psychologist. He gradually asserted his position in the new family, the mysteries behind the glamor of that family will lead him ?

- Part 2 : The Prodigal Son (Đứa con hoang đàng)

From chap 27 to chap 48. Events revolving around a bad guy, who is a son of the wisest man in the underworld. The fate of that family will be like, every human being will show his mask like that ?

- Especial Part : Prequel (Tiền truyện)

An event is said to occur several months before the boss assassination.

Phan Quân decided to stand out the dispute arrangement of the two big brothers "Predatory Carp" Đồng và "Potent" Long. His true purpose is to annex a coal mine to maintain the position of his corporation. Therefore, the smaller groups have linked together behind a mysterious lawyer to ambush Phan Thị.

== Cast ==
=== Phan Thị group ===
- Hoàng Dũng as Phan Quân – the tycoon
- Thanh Quý as Hồ Thu – Tycoon's wife
- Thanh Hương as Phan Hương – Tycoon's daughter
- Anh Đức as "Casanova" or "Prince-consort" Khải – Hương's husband
- Việt Anh as Phan Hải – Tycoon's son
- Đan Lê as Diễm Mi – Hải's wife
- Nam Anh as Phan Hưng – Hải's son
- Trần Quốc Trọng as Phan Sơn – Tycoon's elder brother
- Trung Anh as Lương Bổng
- Bảo Anh as Bảo Ngậu - Undercover cop who was sent to the tycoon's corporation for investigation.
- Trọng Hùng as Trần Tuấn
- Doãn Quốc Đam as Trần Tú – Tuấn's younger brother
- Quốc Quân as "Aurelia" Lân
- Vũ Hải as "Anabas" Hùng
- Danh Thái as A Lý
- Đặng Tam Thuận as "Scar" Thái
- Tạ Vũ Thu as "Skull" Phương
- Đức Hùng as "Bump" Phú
- Huỳnh Anh as a knife player

=== Thiên Long gang (Heavenly Dragon) ===
- Chu Hùng as "Boss-eyed" Thế – the tyrant
- Hoàng Anh as "Stunted" Tùng
- Duy Hưng as "Iron-face" Hoàng
- Đinh Trọng Nguyên as "Ghost-eyes" Chí

=== Bạch Hổ gang (White Tiger) ===
- Hồng Quân as "Toothy" Phúc – the big brother
- Hoàng Du Ka as "Killer" Duy
- Ngọc Quang as Huy Kình
- Mạnh Hùng as Huy Bá – Kình's younger brother

=== Lê family ===
- Văn Báu as Lê Hữu
- Hương Dung as Mrs Hà – Hữu's wife
- Hồng Đăng as Lê Thành – Hữu's son
- Thu Hoài as Lê Thảo – Hữu's daughter

=== The cops ===
- Đỗ Kỷ as Vũ Bắc
- Xuân Thông as Tuấn Anh
- Bình Xuyên as Mạnh Long
- Tiến Hợi as Brigadier Hảo

=== Others ===
- Bảo Thanh as Mỹ Hạnh – Tuấn and Tú's younger sister
- Lưu Đê Ly as Bích Ngọc – Thành's wife
- Nguyệt Hằng as Ngọc's mother
- Thùy Dương as Quyên – Thành's former lover
- Lại Thị Thanh as Vân Điệp – Hải's first lover
- Hán Huy Bách as Đức Vượng – Vân Điệp's former husband
- Thúy An as "Street" Hương – Hải's second lover
- Phú Thăng as Bá Thế, provincial vice-chairman
- Nguyễn Trọng Lân as Bá Anh – Bá Thế's son
- Trần Nhượng as "White" Kính, opium selling tycoon
- Thanh Tú as Black widow
- Quang Điền as Xuân
- Hoàng Du Ka as Duy
- Thế Bình as Mr Phong
- Thiện Tùng as Văn
- Thanh Ngọc as Yến
- Tiến Huy as Vũ
- Tiến Mộc as Sơn Tư – the ghost of a tycoon
- Nguyễn Đỗ Tùng Dương as "Predatory Carp" Đồng
- Phạm Anh Tuấn as "Potent" Long
- Tạ Minh Thảo as Lawyer Đinh Khánh
- Thanh Sơn as Châu Việt Sơn – fire-faced man
- Vân Dung as Ms Quắm

Other cast : Hồng Vân, Thu Hương, Anh Dũng, Thùy Linh, Trọng Lân, Xuân Hồng, Đặng Nam, Tiến Mạnh, Xuân Chung, Ngọc Tuấn, Đỗ Triệu, Xuân Hiền, Trương Văn Tấn.

== Broadcast ==
The drama has released on channel VTV3 since 23 March 2017.

Time	Chapter	Hanoi	HCMC
23 March 2017	1	(<2.27)	(<3.73)
29 March 2017	2	30.06	(<3.25)
30 March 2017	3	41.62	(<2.97)
5 April 2017	4	35.06	3.77
6 April 2017	5	44.79	3.41
12 April 2017	6	39.81	(<3.48)
13 April 2017	7	55.37	3.82
19 April 2017	8	42.27	4.82
20 April 2017	9	52.35	4.14
26 April 2017	10	41.56	(<3.79)
27 April 2017	11	60.67	4.56
3 May 2017	12	39.95	(<3.88)
4 May 2017	13	54.60	3.68
10 May 2017	14	49.17	6.34
11 May 2017	15	59.25	(<4.06)
