= Bui Tuan Dung =

Vietnamese film director

Bùi Tuấn Dũng
- Born: July 12, 1972 (age 54); Thái Bình, Vietnam
- Occupations: Director, writer
- Years active: 2000 - present

Bui Tuan Dung (Bùi Tuấn Dũng, 裴俊勇, born 1972) is a director working in Vietnam Feature Film Studio (Vietnam Feature Film Studio). He is a successful director in both feature films and TV series. With the strength of topic related to war had careful selection from audience and investors, Bui Tuan Dung still has his own image and can prove his talent without using PR tools. Bui Tuan Dung has a wide range of knowledge about the fields his films are in. Thus, details in his movies are very solid and persuasive. He was a judge in the National Film Festival period, and is known for being part of the faculty of the International Film School in Saigon.

== Filmography ==
- Duong thu (film) (2004)
- Hanoi Hanoi (film) (2005)
- The Dance Of Death (2006)
- The Legend Makers (film) (2013)
- Ho Chi Minh in Siam (2015)

== Television series ==
- Linh Lan Trang (2007)
- Nhiem vu dac biet (2009)
- Di qua ngay bien dong (2010)
- Vong tron cam bay (2010)
- Road to Dien Biên (2015)
- Hoa dai trang

== Awards ==
- Golden Kite for Best Feature Film 2006 for “Hanoi, Hanoi”
- Golden Kite for Best Director2006 for “The Wedding In Heaven”.
- Golden Lotus for Best Feature Film - The 15th Vietnam National Film Festival 2007 for “Hanoi, Hanoi”
- Best Audience Choice Feature Film - The 15th Vietnam National Film Festival 2007 for “Hanoi, Hanoi”
- Best Jury Choice Feature Film - The 15th Vietnam National Film Festival 2007 for “The Dance Of Death”.
- Golden Bell for Best Advertising TVC 2007 for TVC “Wedding”
- Awards Golden Lotus for Best Feature Film - The 18th Vietnam Film Festival 2013 for “The Legend Makers (film)”
- A– Ho Chi Minh Award 2015 for “Ho Chi Minh in Siam”
