= The Taste of Intimacy =

- Hương vị tình thân
- Genre: Love, romance, social
- Directed by: Nguyễn Danh Dũng
- Starring: Phương Oanh; Mạnh Trường; Võ Hoài Nam; Thu Quỳnh
- Theme music composer: Trần Quang Duy
- Opening theme: "Hương tình thân" by Lâm Bảo Ngọc
- Ending theme: "Sẽ mãi một tình yêu" by Minh Vương
- Composer: Trần Quang Duy
- Country of origin: Vietnam
- Original language: Vietnamese
- No. of seasons: 2
- No. of episodes: 136

Production
- Production location: Vietnam
- Running time: 30 minutes/episode
- Production company: Vietnam Television Film Center

Original release
- Network: VTV
- Release: 19 April – 27 October 2021

Related
- My Only One

Hương vị tình thân (English: The Taste of Intimacy) is a TV series produced by Vietnam Television Film Center, Vietnam Television directed by Nguyễn Danh Dũng. The film was adapted from the 2018 Korean drama My Only One. The series aired at 9:00 p.m every Monday to Friday starting from April 19, 2021, and ended on October 27, 2021, on channel VTV1.

== Plot ==
Phương Nam, a young girl with a strong personality, has her family life shaken when she learns she was adopted. Her adoptive father, Mr. Tuấn, dies in a car accident, and Mrs. Bích, Nam's adoptive mother, runs away, leaving Nam with a large debt. Mr. Sinh, Nam's biological father, reunites with her after more than 20 years in prison, becoming a quiet protective presence. While navigating family drama, Nam rekindles a relationship with a man named Long, which is opposed by multiple people in her life. It is revealed that Mr. Sinh's past is tied to grudges related to Long's family. Meanwhile, Khánh Thy, Nam's enemy, attempts to break up the relationship between Nam and Long so she can date the man herself.

== Cast ==
=== Main actors ===
- Phương Oanh as Lê Phương Nam
  - Hà Anh as Child Phương Nam
- Mạnh Trường as Hoàng Long
- Thu Quỳnh as Nguyễn Khánh Thy
  - Nguyễn Ngọc An Nhiên as Child Khánh Thy
- Võ Hoài Nam as Mr Nguyễn Lê Sinh
  - Doãn Quốc Đam as Young Mr. Sinh
- Như Quỳnh as Mrs Dần
- Quách Thu Phương as Mrs Thanh Xuân
- Tú Oanh as Mrs Bùi Thị Bích
  - Linh Hương as Young Mrs. Bich
- Trịnh Mai Nguyên as Mr Hoàng Khang
- Hoàng Anh Vũ as Hoàng Huy
- Thu Hạnh as Mrs Sa
  - Minh Thu as Young Mrs. Sa
- Ánh Tuyết as Young Ngọc Diệp (part 1)
  - Bích Ngọc as Ngọc Diệp (part 2)
    - Phụng Nghi as Child Diệp
- Sỹ Hưng as Nguyễn Hùng Dũng
- Công Lý as Mr. Lê Văn Tuấn
  - Đỗ Duy Nam as Young Mr. Tuấn

=== Supporting actors ===
- Tô Dũng as Phi
- Việt Hoa as Thiên Nga
- Việt Bắc as Hồng
- Bùi Bài Bình as Chiến "chó"'s father
- Hồ Phong as Mr. Cao Mạnh Tấn
  - Xuân Thắng as Young Mr. Tấn
- Linh Huệ as Mrs Tâm
- Phạm Anh Tuấn as Chiến "chó"
- Sơn Tùng as Khánh "trọc"
- Nam Anh as Kỳ Duyên
- Trương Hoàng as Lâm
- Mạnh Đạt as Cường
- Đặng Minh Cúc as Sâm
- Đào Hoàng Yến as Nguyệt
- Phùng Khánh Linh as Liễu
- Đào Hiền Thục Anh as Thuỳ Dương
- Vũ Hải as Mr. Thắng
- Minh Nguyệt as Mrs. Nhàn
