= Võ Hoài Nam =

Vietnamese actor

Merited Artist Võ Hoài Nam
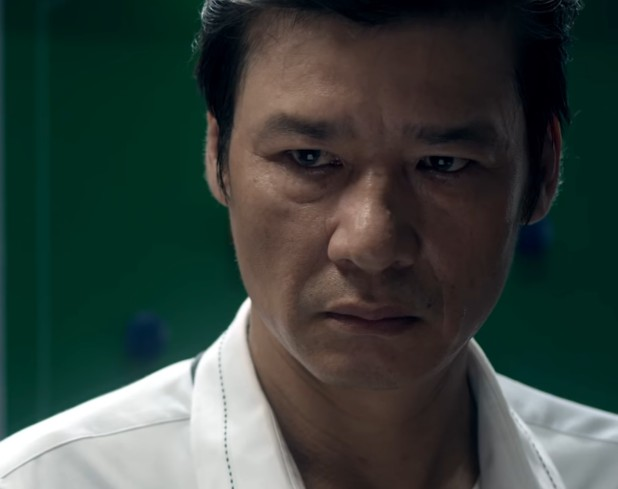
- Võ Hoài Nam in 2018
- Born: Võ Hoài Nam; 29 December 1965 (age 60); Hanoi, Vietnam
- Occupations: Actor; Film director
- Years active: 1991–present
- Title: Merited Artist (2007)

Võ Hoài Nam (born 29 December 1965) is a Vietnamese actor who became famous for his role as Trọng in the film Vua bãi rác (King of the Dump) directed by Đỗ Minh Tuấn in 2002 and the role of Mr. Sinh in Hương vị tình thân. He was awarded the title of Meritorious Artist in 2007.

== Career ==
Võ Hoài Nam's parents divorced when he was only 2 years old. At the age of 13, he began to be independent. Hoai Nam was a state-employed actor when he studied drama class 1991–1993 at Vietnam Drama Theater and worked there for 1 year. After that, he went to the South to start a career, supporting film crews and acting in some films.

From 1997 to 2000, Võ Hoài Nam's name began to be known to more audiences when he played the role of police officer Chiến in the TV series Criminal Police.

In 2002, he played the role of Trọng in the movie "Vua bãi rác". This role helped him receive the Best Young Actor award at the 47th Asia – Pacific Film Festival in Busan, South Korea. In 2021, he played Mr. Sinh in the TV series Hương vị tình thân, leaving a lot of emotions for the audience.

== Personal life ==
Võ Hoài Nam is married to dancer Lan Anh (12 years younger than him) and has four children.

== Films ==
Year	Title	Role	Format	Notes
1991	Truyền thuyết tình yêu Thần Nước	Sơn Tinh	Movie	First movie
1994	Hải Đường trắng	Liêu Sang	Video flim	
1994	Thờ thơ ấu	Hoàng	Video flim	
1995	Nội			
1996	Cỏ lồng vực	Bình	TV-movie	
1996	Nước mắt thời mở cửa	Hoàng	Movie	
1997	"Năm ngày làm thượng đế"	Trần Kiên Cường	TV-movie	
1998	Người nối dõi	Cường		
1998	Tiếng Sáo ly hương	Vũ	Movie	
1999–2001	Criminal Police	Chiến	Series	First 39 episodes
2001	Vua bãi rác	Trọng	Movie	
2002	Điện hoa	Sáng	TV-movie	
2003	Người đàn bà mộng du	Hòa	Movie	
2004	Hai khoảng cuộc đời		TV-Movie	
2004	Rặng trâm bầu	Major Sang	TV-Movie	
2004	Chuyện phố phường	Nam	Series	
2009	Hoa mua đầu núi		Video film	Film director
2010	Rock và Rap	Huy	Video film	and screenwriter
2010	Bức tường ngăn có 5 màu		Video film	and screenwriter
2011	Song hùng kì dị	Ấn Phong	Series	and film director
2018	11 niềm hy vọng	An	Movie	
2021	Hương vị tình thân	Mr Sinh	Series	
2023	Món quà của cha	Mr Nhân	Series	
