= List of VTV dramas broadcast in 2023 =

This is a list of VTV dramas released in 2023.

←2022 – 2023 – 2024→

== VTV1 Weeknight Prime-time dramas ==
These dramas air from 21:00 to 21:30, Monday to Friday on VTV1.

- Note: To celebrate the 50th anniversary of the establishment of diplomatic relations between Vietnam and Japan, from 30 Mar to 18 May, the time slot was followed by 2015 drama Khúc hát mặt trời re-release version (adjusted from original 24 episodes to 34 episodes).

Broadcast	Title	Eps.	Prod.	Cast and crew	Theme song(s)	Genre	Notes
12 Jan-29 Mar	Dưới bóng cây hạnh phúc (Under the Tree of Happiness)	45 (30′); Replay: 26 (50')	VFC	Vũ Trường Khoa (director); Trịnh Đan Phượng, Trịnh Cẩm Hằng, Trịnh Khánh Hà (writers); Nguyễn Kim Oanh, Mạnh Hưng, Bùi Như Lai, Hoàng Anh Vũ, Kiều My, Quốc Trị, Mạnh Cường, Thạch Thu Huyền, Lương Thanh, Bùi Vũ Phong, Thái Sơn, Nguyễn Mạnh Cường, Đậu Hồng Phúc, Trọng Trí, Việt Hoa, Huyền Trang, Ngọc Thoa, Xuân Trường, Đức Hùng, Đào Hoàng Yến, Phú Thăng, Tuấn Giang, Thiên Kiều, Trịnh Huyền, Trần Tài, Trần Bảo Nam, Hoàng Khánh Ly... Cameo: Công Lý	Hạnh phúc vụt qua (Fleeting Happiness) by Mai Diệu Ly	Drama, Family, Marriage, Slice-of-Life	Delayed 10 eps on 17 Jan, 20 & 23-27 Jan, 3 & 28 Feb and 10 Mar.
22 May-28 Jul	Nơi giấc mơ tìm về (A Home for Dreams)	45	VFC	Trịnh Lê Phong (director); Lê Anh Thúy, Nguyễn Mạnh Cường, Đặng Diệu Hương, Đàm Vân Anh (writers); Lê Khanh, Đỗ Kỷ, Lãnh Thanh, Việt Hoa, Minh Thu, Thục Anh, Trung Tuấn, Trọng Trinh, Đặng Tất Bình, Phương Hạnh, Hoàng Huy, Linh Huệ, Đình Chiến, Minh Phương, Lê Tuấn Thành, Anh Tuấn, Hà Trung, Đỗ Phạm Khánh Linh, Hoàng Tùng, Hoàng Ngọc Hải, Linh Hương, Bích Thủy, Trọng Nghĩa, Nguyễn Tú, Trịnh Nguyệt Minh...	Yêu thật nhiều (Love So Much) by Duy Chiến, Minh Ngọc	Drama, Slice-of-Life, Family, Comedy, Romance	Delayed 5 eps on 2 & 9 Jun, 14-15 Jun and 21 Jun. Formerly: Bà ngoại lắm chiêu (Skillful Granny)
31 Jul-8 Sep	Làng trong phố (Village in the Street)	30	VFC	Nguyễn Mai Hiền (director); Lê Anh Thúy (idea); Nguyễn Mạnh Cường, Lê Thu Thủy, Đàm Vân Anh (writers); Doãn Quốc Đam, Duy Hưng, Tiến Lộc, Trần Vân, Đào Phương Anh, Thanh Dương, Huyền Trang, Lý Thanh Kha, Phùng Đức Hiếu, Ngô Lệ Quyên, Đình Chiến, Tú An, Hoàng Du Ka, Đào Hoàng Yến, Linh Chi, Nguyễn Huyền Trang, Thái Dương, Đào Trúc Mai, Tất Đông, Ngô Thủy Tiên, Tiến Ngọc, Mai Huê, Cao Tú Hường, Nguyễn Ngọc Gia Phúc...		Drama, Rural, Romance, Slice-of-Life	a.k.a. Phố trong làng 2 (Street in the Village)
11 Sep-8 Nov	Cuộc chiến không giới tuyến (Borderless Battle)	40 (30′); Replay: 20 (50′)	VFC	Nguyễn Danh Dũng (director); Nguyễn Thu Thủy, Phạm Ngọc Hà Lê, Dương Hồng Hải, Đức Bảo (writers); Việt Anh, Hoàng Hải, Thu Quỳnh, Hà Việt Dũng, Hoàng Công, Tô Dũng, Trần Trung Kiên, Việt Bắc, Phan Thắng, Bùi Bài Bình, Tú Oanh, Ngọc Tản, Phú Kiên, Thái Sơn, Sỹ Toàn, Nguyễn Long Vũ, Hồng Nhung, Trần Việt Hoàng, Trần Chiến, Phương Nam, Minh Hiếu, Lưu Huyền Trang, Hoàng Triều Dương...		Crime, Drama, Political, Ethnic	Delayed 3 eps on 28 Sep, 12 Oct and 2 Nov. Celebrating the 80th anniversary of the founding of the Vietnam People's Army
9 Nov 2023-4 Mar 2024	Chúng ta phải hạnh phúc (We All Must Be Happy)	68 (30′); Replay: 34 (50')	VICGroup LLC & VTV	Đinh Thái Thụy (director); Như Trân, Vương Thuấn, Đinh Thái Thụy (writers); Vĩnh Xương, Đinh Y Nhung, Thanh Thức, Ngô Phương Anh, Linh Sơn, Mai Tâm Như, Ngọc Tưởng, Xuân Hiệp, Nguyễn Sao Mai, Lâm Mỹ Vân, Ngân Quỳnh, Đào Anh Tuấn, Đào Vân Anh, Hồng Anh, Bảo Tân, Tăng Gia Hân, Quốc Vũ, Khải An, Vĩnh Khang, Châu Hà Yến Nhi, Châu Thế Tâm, Phạm Tất Thành, Lê Mạnh Phương, Cao Hoàng, Kim Lợi, Trần Thanh Hiền, Trần Hoàng Anh Phương, Huỳnh Phương Uyên, Trương Phương, Lim Phước Sang, Thúy Lê, Quang Thuận, Mộc Linh, Lê Hà...	Chúng ta phải hạnh phúc (We Must Be Happy) by Đông Hải, Hồ Ngọc Giã & Niềm hạnh phúc riêng mình (My Own Happiness) by Văn Tứ Quý	Drama, Family	Delayed 15 eps on 12 & 20 Dec, 26 & 28-29 Dec; 1 & 5 Jan, 1–2 & 8–9 Feb, 12–14 & 26 Feb due to special events. The second non-VFC drama to be aired in this time slot since Bão ngầm.

== VTV3 Weeknight Prime-time dramas ==
=== First line-up ===
These dramas air from 20:00 to 20:25 (20:00 to 20:30 from 3 Apr), Monday to Friday on VTV3.

From 25 Jul to 11 Aug, the time slot was filled in by the playback of 4 episodes named Người cha không mong đợi from the series Xin chào hạnh phúc; then the music show Nhật ký trên khóa Sol (Sol Key Diary), re-broadcast from VTV5.

From 14 Aug 2023 to 1 Mar 2024, this drama time slot was temporarily replaced by the program Lướt trên VTVGo (Surfing on VTVGo) to promote the application of the national digital platform family.

Broadcast	Title	Eps.	Prod.	Cast and crew	Theme song(s)	Genre	Notes
7 Mar-24 Jul	Gia đình đại chiến - Mùa 2 (Great War of Family - Season 2)	100	VFC & VTVCab	Trọng Trinh (director); VTVCab scripting team (writers); Đức Khuê, Nguyệt Hằng, Tùng Anh, Hương Linh, Phương Hạnh, Lưu Huyền Trang, Hoàng Huy, Nam Linh, Thanh Huyền, Trần Thu Trang, Ngọc Dung, Trình Lê, Quang Anh, Tuấn Long, Quỳnh Ân, Ngọc Dương... Cameo: Trọng Trinh	I Love My Family & Nhà trong phố (A Home in Town) by Hải Nam	Comedy, Family	

=== Second line-up ===
==== Monday-Wednesday dramas ====
These dramas air from 21:40 to 22:30, Monday to Wednesday on VTV3.

Broadcast	Title	Eps.	Prod.	Cast and crew	Theme song(s)	Genre	Notes
30 Jan-29 Mar	Đừng nói khi yêu (In Love, Don't Say)	27	VFC	Bùi Tiến Huy (director); Hân Như, Hà Thu Hà, Trịnh Khánh Hà (writers); Mạnh Trường, Thùy Anh, Đình Tú, Trình Mỹ Duyên, Đức Khuê, Tú Oanh, Quách Thu Phương, Xuân Trường, Lương Thanh, Thái Dũng, Mỹ Uyên, Thu Hiền, Phí Thùy Linh, Sỹ Hưng, Anh Dũng, Hà Phương Anh, Nguyễn Hoàng Ngọc Huyền, Trương Hoàng, Trọng Trí, Xuân Thắng, Sơn Tùng, Đức Trung, Trần Đức, Lâm Tùng, Phạm Thị Ngọc Anh, Phạm Tuấn Anh, Đỗ Phạm Khánh Linh, Hoàng Ngọc Hải... Cameo: Hà Việt Dũng, Charlie Winston	Hóa ra như vậy là yêu (Turns Out That's What Love Is) by Trang Pháp	Romance, Comedy, Family, Drama	Formerly: Cô thợ bánh (Miss Baker)
3 Apr-12 Jul	Cuộc đời vẫn đẹp sao (How Beautiful Life is Still)	45	VFC	Nguyễn Danh Dũng (director); Lê Huyền, Mai Diệp, Trịnh Khánh Hà (writers); Hoàng Hải, Thanh Hương, Thanh Quý, Tô Dũng, Anh Thơ, Hoàng Du Ka, Minh Cúc, Trần Việt Hoàng, Hà Đan, Phạm Tuấn Anh, Anh Tuấn, Ngọc Thư, Minh Tuấn, Việt Bắc, Thanh Dương, Bích Thủy, Hoàng Huy, Đào Hoàng Yến, Lý Chí Huy, Thái Dương, Trần Chiến, Bích Diệp... Cameo: Đức Khuê, Nguyễn Danh Dũng	A í A (Ah ee Ah) by Dương Trường Giang	Drama, Slice-of-Life, Comedy, Romance	
17 Jul-30 Aug	Món quà của cha (Father's Gift)	21	VFC	Vũ Minh Trí (director); Nguyễn Ngọc Quỳnh Chi, Đặng Thu Hà, Hiểu Anh, Đặng Diệu Hương, Hoàng Hồng Hạnh (writers); Võ Hoài Nam, Tuấn Tú, Nguyễn Ngọc Huyền, Lưu Duy Khánh, Hương Giang, Minh Hòa, Lương Thu Hà, Nguyễn Quỳnh Trang, Anh Tuấn, Nguyễn Bảo Linh, Vũ Hồng Thái, Lâm Đức Anh, Nguyễn Thị Mai Huê, Minh Thu, Đào Trúc Mai, Thanh Tú, Anh Đức, Trần Cường, Hàn Trang, Nguyễn Ngọc An Nhiên, Hoàng Huy, Hải Ly, Trần Quốc Anh, Trúc Quỳnh, Tiến Ngọc, Thái Dương, Kim Ngân, Ngô Thủy Tiên, Nguyễn Huy, Mai Mạnh, Sơn Tùng, Tô Hùng, Diệp Xinh...	Mong ước cho con (Wishes for You) & Cha và con gái (Father and Daughter) by Lan Quỳnh	Family, Drama, Marriage	
4 Sep-1 Nov	Cảnh sát hình sự: Biệt dược đen (Criminal Police: Black Narcotic)	27	VFC	Phạm Gia Phương, Trần Trọng Khôi (directors); Phạm Đình Hải, Vũ Liêm (writers); Bảo Anh, Huỳnh Anh, Hoàng Long, Lương Thanh, Hoàng Anh Vũ, Đỗ Duy Nam, Bình An, Phạm Tuấn Anh, Quỳnh Châu, Trương Hoàng, Nguyễn Huyền Trang, Ngọc Quỳnh, Vĩnh Xương, Hoàng Xuân, Trịnh Mai Nguyên, Nguyệt Hằng, Trần Quốc Trọng, Trần Đức, Phú Thăng, Dương Đức Quang, Xuân Trường, Thái Sơn, Thanh Huế, Hồng Nhung, Trần Bảo Nam, Phương My, Ngô Minh Hoàng, Hồng Ngọc, Nguyễn Tú, Trần Tài, Vương Trọng Trí, Hà Bùi, Khánh Linh, Hồ Liên, Tùng Anh...		Crime, Drama, Marriage, Political	Formerly: Phía sau sự thật (Behind the Truth)
6 Nov 2023-6 Mar 2024	Chúng ta của 8 năm sau (Us of 8 Years Later)	51; Pt.1: 15e Pt.2: 36e	VFC	Bùi Tiến Huy (director); Trịnh Khánh Hà, Nguyễn Thu Thủy (writers); Hoàng Hà/Phan Minh Huyền, Trần Quốc Anh/Mạnh Trường, Nguyễn Hoàng Ngọc Huyền/Quỳnh Kool, Trần Nghĩa/B Trần, Trung Anh, Khôi Trần, Phùng Đức Hiếu, Thùy Anh, Thu Huyền, Chu Diệp Anh, Nguyễn Ngọc An Nhiên, Thúy Hà, Đức Khuê, Văn Báu, Vân Anh, Phương Hạnh, Hồ Phong, Lưu Duy Khánh, Tuấn Cường, Zoe Như Quỳnh, Lý Chí Huy, Phùng Khánh Linh, Cù Thị Trà, Nga Quỳnh, Vũ Thủy, Phan Thắng, Xuân Thắng, Quách Phong, Thanh Tùng, Huyền Trang, Trương Thu Hà, Thùy Dương, Tiến Ngọc, Việt Tiến, Lưu Hoàng...	Đôi mươi (Twenties) by Hoàng Dũng Cơn mưa rào (Lashing Rain) by Văn Mai Hương	Romance, Drama	Delayed 3 eps on 12-14 Feb due to Tet holiday. Formerly: Ánh dương rực rỡ (Brilliant Sunshine)

==== Thursday-Friday dramas ====
These dramas air from 21:40 to 22:30, Thursday and Friday on VTV3.

Broadcast	Title	Eps.	Prod.	Cast and crew	Theme song(s)	Genre	Notes
9 Mar-15 Sep	Gia đình mình vui bất thình lình (Suddenly Happy Family)	56	VFC	Nguyễn Đức Hiếu, Lê Đỗ Ngọc Linh (directors); Lại Phương Thảo, Tiết Kim Oanh, Mai Búp, Ngô Như Trang (writers); Bùi Bài Bình, Lan Hương 'Bông', Quang Sự, Kiều Anh, Doãn Quốc Đam, Lan Phương, Bùi Gia Nghĩa, Thanh Sơn, Khả Ngân, Phạm Ngọc Anh, Công Lý, Linh Huệ, Phương Hạnh, Cù Thị Trà, Trần Minh Phương, Jimmii Khánh, Phạm Tuấn Anh, Tô Hùng, Trọng Lân, Lily Chen, Dương Thu Hương, Nguyễn Long Vũ, Mai Huê, Thái Sơn, Trần Thị Diễm Hương, Thu Hiền, San Trần, Đào Nguyễn Ánh, Ngô Minh Hoàng, Phương Lâm, Nguyễn Lan Hương, Tuấn Anh, Lâm Tùng, Hoàng Khánh Ly, Tô Dũng... Cameo: Đỗ Kỷ, Tú Oanh, Lương Thu Trang, Hà Trung, Nhâm Mạnh Dũng, Quốc Trị	Tìm về (Getting Back) by Ninh, Lý Bực, Phương Cào; Tôi muốn về nhà (I Want to Go Home) by Hoàng Bách	Family, Comedy, Drama, Romance	Formerly: Nhà có 3 nàng dâu (Family with 3 Brides)
21 Sep 2023-19 Jan 2024	Không ngại cưới, chỉ cần 1 lý do (We Just Need 1 Reason to Get Married)	36	VFC	Bùi Quốc Việt (director); Trần Diệu Linh, Ngô Thị Như Trang, Lại Phương Thảo, Đỗ Thủy Tiên (writers); Hoàng Thùy Linh, Nhan Phúc Vinh, Trọng Lân, Quỳnh Lương, Phú Đôn, Nguyễn Thanh Bình, Bảo Hân, Quang Anh, Linh Huệ, Anh Đức, Otis Đỗ Nhật Trường, Ngọc Anh, Long Vũ, Trịnh Huyền, Hà Trung, Nguyễn Thùy Dương, Nam Việt, Hương Linh...	Yêu thì phải nói (Love Must Be Said) by Emcee L ft. Badbie	Comedy, Romance, Drama, Office, Family	Formerly: Ngao hoa lục sắc (Six-coloured Flower Clams)

== See also ==
- List of dramas broadcast by Vietnam Television (VTV)
- List of dramas broadcast by Hanoi Radio Television (HanoiTV)
- List of dramas broadcast by Vietnam Digital Television (VTC)
