= El Bronx (TV series) =

Colombian telenovela

- Genre: Drama; Action
- Created by: Gustavo Bolívar
- Written by: Gustavo Bolívar; Yesmer Uribe
- Directed by: Sergio Osorio; Santiago Vargas; Felipe Paredes
- Starring: Rosmeri Marval; José Julián Gaviria; Rodrigo Candamil; Natasha Klauss; Ramiro Meneses
- Opening theme: "Aunque me juegue la vida" by José Julián Gaviria
- Country of origin: Colombia
- Original language: Spanish
- No. of seasons: 1
- No. of episodes: 81

Production
- Executive producer: Claudia Facio Lince
- Producer: Nelsón Martínez
- Production location: Bogotá
- Camera setup: Multi-camera
- Production company: Fox Telecolombia

Original release
- Network: Caracol Televisión
- Release: January 29 – May 27, 2019

El Bronx: Amar será su salvación, or simply El Bronx, is a Colombian television series written by Gustavo Bolívar and produced by Fox Telecolombia and Caracol Televisión, based on the events that occurred in the sector of El Bronx, a place that is located in the center of Bogotá, where people lived in misery, drugs and crime. The series features the debut of Venezuelan actress Rosmeri Marval as the titular character. The show ended on May 27, 2019.

== Plot ==
The story revolves around ‘El Bronx’, a sector located in the center of Bogotá and that was for years, one of the most dangerous places in Colombia. Andrés (José Julián Gaviria) and Juliana (Rosmeri Marval), are two young people who, due to indecision, end up entering the ‘El Bronx’. Both, along with other people who have seen their lives, as are being dragged through this place thanks to poverty, misery, drugs and organized crime, seeking to risk their lives at every moment, for that they seek to find the happiness that ‘El Bronx’ snatched.

== Cast ==
- Rosmeri Marval as Juliana Luna
- José Julián Gaviria as Andrés Cárdenas
- Rodrigo Candamil as Gerardo Noriega
- Natasha Klauss as Sara de Noriega
- Ramiro Meneses as Carlos Luna
- Ella Becerra as Rubiela Gómez
- Marcela Gallego as Patricia
- Santiago Soto as Lorenzo Kölher
- Jim Muñoz as Manolo Franco
- Juan Carlos Messier as Alfredo Venegas
- Sandra Guzmán as María «Marucha»
- Hans Martínez as Jorge Tovar
- Lina Castrillón as Carmen Andrade
- Ginna Parra as Camila Noriega
- Alejandra Crispin as Estrella
- Juan Felipe Muñoz as Raya
- Adrián Sánchez as Cicatriz
- Jonathan Bedoya as Nicolás Noriega
- Juan Millán as Fernado
- Lucho Velasco as El Ganzo
- Johanna Castraño as Perla
- Marta Nieto as Judith Paz
- Diana Motta as Nina
- Alina Lozano as Helena
- Diana Herrera as Karen
- Julián Farietta as Chico
- Eileen Roca as Mónica
- Gustavo Ángel as Luciano Sanin
- Ana Wills as Gabriela
- Mauricio Navas as Milton Neira
- Tatiana de los Ríos as Parca
- Rafael Arturo Uribe as Caracha
- María Teresa López as Gladys
- Laura Hernández as Nicole
- Chris Maither Pestana as Stella
- Dubán Prado as San Andres
- Cristian Madrigal as Gomelo
- Lenard Vanderaa as Sergio Torrijos
- Felix Mercado as Formol
- Diana Mendoza Solano as Paloma
- David Guerrero as Jaime
- Carlos Manuel Vesga as Marlon Galeano "Picasso"
- Alejandro Gutiérrez as Botero
- Fabian Villa as Carlos Rodríguez
- Ivonne Gómez as Pilar
- Eliana Diosa as Suarez
- Yulieth Giraldo as Marcela Gómez
- Felipe Giraldo as Manuel Rojas
- Christian Ramos as Jorge Sastoque
- Eleazar Osorio as Alvaro Otalvaro
