= Thu Quỳnh =

Vietnamese actress

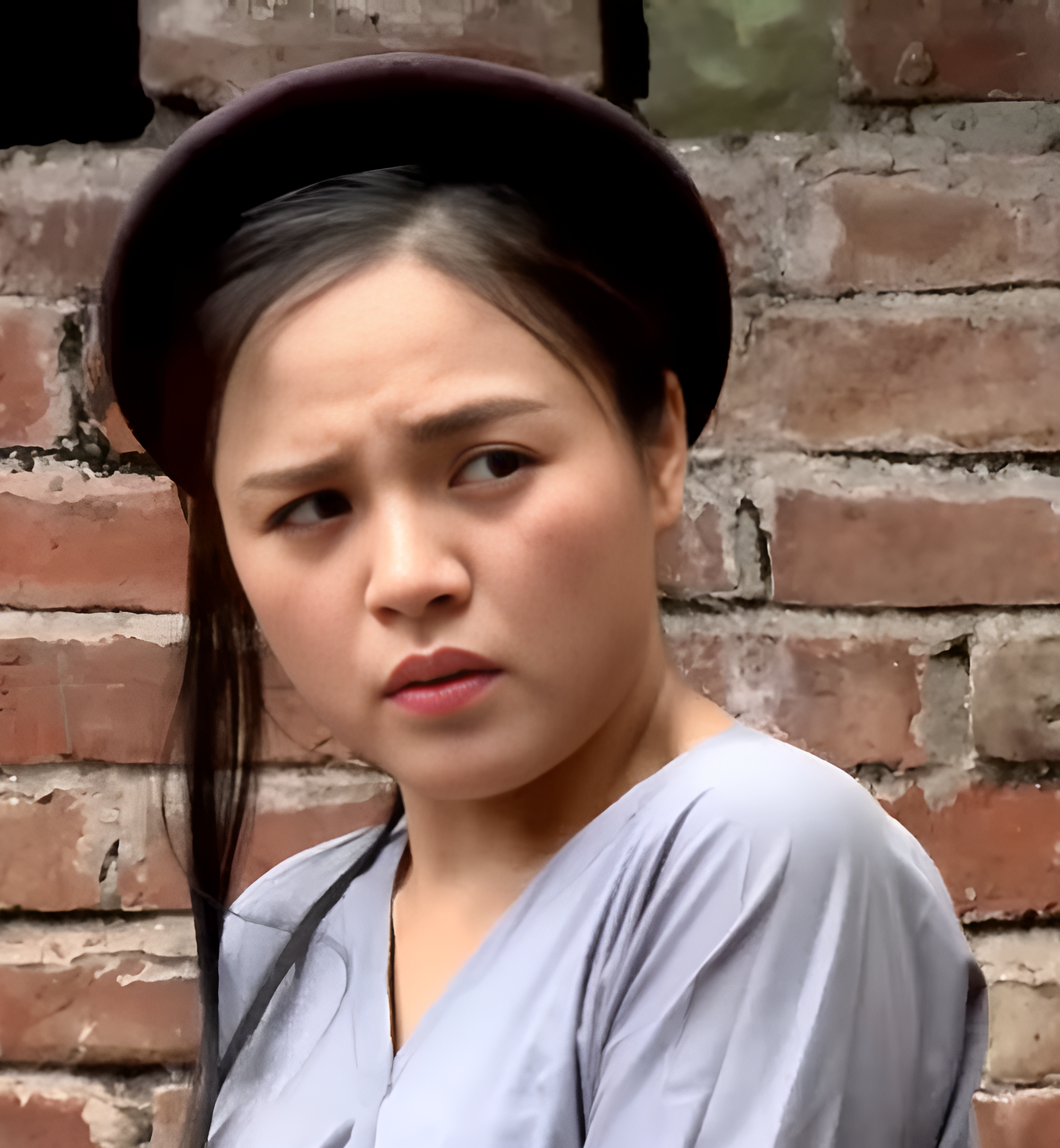
- Quỳnh in 2017
- Born: Nguyễn Thu Quỳnh; September 30, 1988 (age 38); Hanoi, Vietnam
- Occupation: Actress, vlogger
- Years active: 2008–
- Height: 1.69 m (5 ft 7 in)
- Spouse: Chí Nhân (m. 2014; div. 2015)
- Children: 2

Nguyễn Thu Quỳnh (born September 30, 1988) is a Vietnamese actress and vlogger. She first gained public attention as one of the 30 excellent contestants who participated in the final round of the Miss Vietnam 2008 contest.

== Filmography ==
| Year | Name | Role | Director | Channel | Notes | Source |
|---|---|---|---|---|---|---|
| 2007 | Hai lần được sống | Tâm | Phạm Hoàng Hà | VTV3 | | |
| 2008 | Những người độc thân vui vẻ | Guest star | Đỗ Thanh Hải, Phạm Thanh Phong, Nguyễn Khải Anh, Trọng Trinh | VTV3 | | |
| 2008 | Nhà có nhiều cửa sổ | Thúy | Vũ Hồng Sơn, Phi Tiến Sơn | VTV1 | | |
| 2009 | 13 nữ tù | Mai Hoa | Lưu Trọng Ninh | VTV3 | | |
| 2011 | Huyền sử thiên đô | Công chúa Cúc Phương | Đặng Tất Bình, Phạm Thanh Phong | VTV3 | | |
| 2012 | Cửa sổ thủy tinh | Dì Xíu / Suri | Phạm Tuấn Quang | VTV3 | | |
| 2013 | Hương ngọc lan | Phương Vy | Nguyễn Đức Hiếu | VTV3 | | |
| 2017 | Nơi ẩn nấp bình yên | Thanh Vy | Nguyễn Đức Hiếu | VTV1 | | |
| 2017 | Sống chung với mẹ chồng | Trang | Vũ Trường Khoa | VTV1 | | |
| 2017 | Hoa hồng mua chịu | Phương | Vũ Xuân Hưng | VTV6 | (Note: The film finished filming in 2014, however for some reasons the film aired later than expected.) | |
| 2017 | Ngược chiều nước mắt | Thu Phương | Vũ Minh Trí | VTV1 | | |
| 2018 | Quỳnh búp bê | My “sói” | Mai Hồng Phong | VTV1/VTV3 | (Note: Golden Kite Award Winning Film 2018) | |
| 2018 | Yêu thì ghét thôi | Quỳnh | Trịnh Lê Phong | VTV3 | (Note: Guest) | |
| 2019 | Về nhà đi con | Thu Huệ | Nguyễn Danh Dũng | VTV1 | (Note: Golden Kite Award Winning Film 2019) | |
| 2020 | Những ngày không quên | Thu Huệ | Nguyễn Danh Dũng, Trịnh Lê Phong | VTV1 | | |
| 2020 | Lửa ấm | Khánh Ngọc | Đào Duy Phúc | VTV1 | | |
| 2021 | Hương vị tình thân | Khánh Thy | Nguyễn Danh Dũng | VTV1 | | |
| 2022 | Hành trình công lý | Hoàng An Nguyệt | Nguyễn Mai Hiền | VTV3 | | |
| 2023 | Sứ mệnh yêu thương | Dã Quỳ / Thị Đào | Nguyễn Đức Nhật Thanh | VieON | | |
| 2023 | Cuộc chiến không giới tuyến | Lang Phương | Nguyễn Danh Dũng | VTV1 | | |
| 2025 | Cha tôi, người ở lại | Liên | Vũ Trường Khoa | VTV3 | | |
