= Phương Oanh =

Vietnamese actress

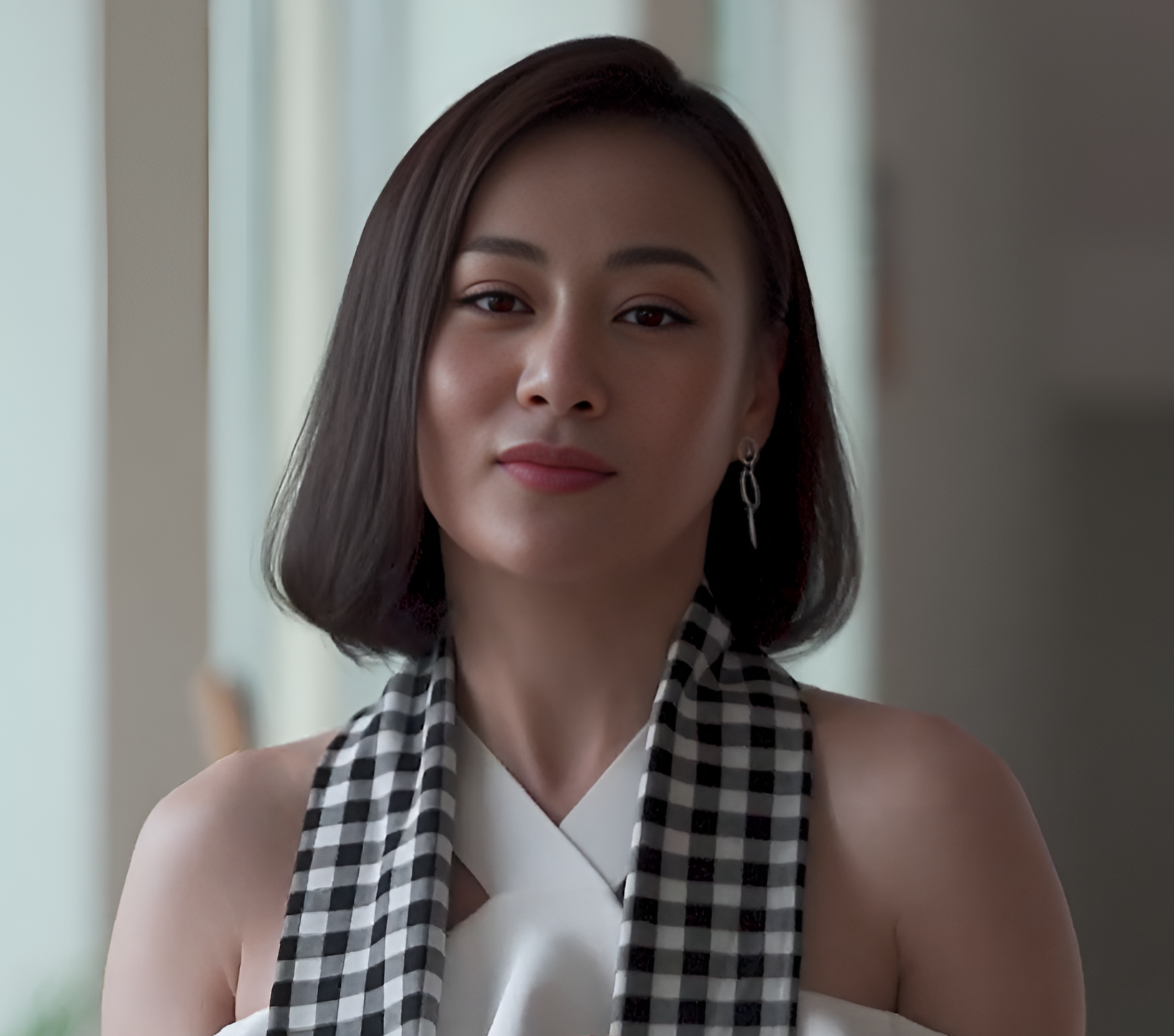
- Oanh in 2019
- Born: Đỗ Phương Oanh; September 23, 1989 (age 36); Hà Nam, Vietnam
- Occupations: Actress; Model; Singer
- Years active: 2012–
- Height: 1.67 m (5 ft 6 in)

Đỗ Phương Oanh (born September 23, 1989), simply known by her stage name Phương Oanh, is a Vietnamese actress, model and singer.

== Early life ==
Oanh was born in Phủ Lý, Hà Nam province. She has three siblings: older sisters Do Phuong Dung and Do Hong Nhung, and younger brother Do Binh Minh. When Oanh was in 9th grade, her parents' business went downhill, so Oanh did not have the conditions to go to extra classes like some of her peers. To help her parents, Oanh decided not to go to extra classes and studied at home for three years of high school to avoid spending more on tuition.

== Career ==
=== 2008–2011: Modeling ===
From 2008 until 2011, Oanh was a freelance model. She tried her hand at the "Vietnam Jewelry Queen" contest in 2008 when she was a second-year student. As a model, Oanh modeled for advertisements and participated in fashion shows. She ultimately decided not to move forward with beauty pageants, and instead tried for forge a career in acting.

=== 2012–: Acting and singing ===
Since 2012, Oanh has appeared in television series and films. Her first role was Vuong Thi Hoa in the film Hoa bay on HTV9 channel. At the start of her career, Oanh endured psychological pressure from the online community and skepticism about her acting, which caused her to drink excessively.

Oanh received positive media coverage after the release of the 2018 film Quỳnh búp bê, in which she played the titular Quỳnh, a girl forced into prostitution. She said about the film's production, "the most difficult thing...was having to lower my ego, because in real life I am very sensitive, very emotional and even agitated, sometimes even slightly sensitive words make me bristle. When playing the role of a prostitute, the words for Quynh were crude, even vulgar. Therefore, I had to put aside my ego to live with the character's circumstances and life, to feel in harmony and get used to the character".

In 2023, Oanh released the music video "Tay trái chỉ trăng (Upwards to the Moon)" (Vietnamese lyrics from the song of the same name performed by Chinese singer Sa Dingding in the movie Ashes of Love). The MV was released on January 15, 2023.

== Personal life ==
Oanh is married to businessman Nguyen Hoa Binh (Shark Binh). The two were dating by August 2022; at the time Binh was married to Dao Lan Huong, while the two had agreed to divorce, which was official by May 2023.

Oanh and Binh married on June 15, 2023, at the People's Committee of Liem Chinh Ward. At the end of July, they held their engagement and wedding ceremonies. The wedding scheduled for November 11 was postponed because the actress was pregnant with twins and suffered from morning sickness during the wedding preparations, so all plans had to be changed. After consideration, Oanh and Shark Binh felt that they could not prepare for a complete and proper wedding, so they decided to postpone it until their two children were born. On May 14, 2024, Oanh gave birth to twins, a boy and a girl, at a hospital in Hanoi.

== Filmography ==
Year	Title	Role	Director	Channel
2012	Hoa bay	Vương Thị Hoa	Xuân Sơn & Đăng Khoa	HTV9
2013	Giấc mơ hạnh phúc	Hân	Bùi Huy Thuần	VTV1
2013	Gái già xì tin	Dương	Trần Quang Vinh	VTV6
2014	Lấy chồng trước tết	Cúc	Phạm Thanh Phong	VTV1
2014	Lời thì thầm từ quá khứ	Trang	Mai Hồng Phong	VTV3
2014	Hoa phượng trắng		Lưu Ngọc Hà	VTV6
2015	Lời ru mùa đông	Oanh	Mai Hồng Phong	VTV1
2015	Tái sinh	Đông	Khải Hưng	VTV1
2015	Đối thủ kỳ phùng	Linh Đa	Nguyễn Quang	VTV1
2016	Hợp đồng hôn nhân	Thu	Nguyễn Khải Hưng	VTV1
2017	Lặng yên dưới vực sâu	Súa	Đào Duy Phúc	VTV3
2017	Giao mùa	Nhạn	Trần Hoài Sơn	VTV1
2017	Ngược chiều nước mắt	Mai	Vũ Minh Trí	VTV1
2018	Quỳnh búp bê	Quỳnh	Mai Hồng Phong	VTV1; VTV3
2019	Nàng dâu order	Vy	Bùi Quốc Việt	VTV3
2020	Cô gái nhà người ta	Thu Uyên	Trịnh Lê Phong	VTV3
2020	Những ngày không quên	Thu Uyên	Nguyễn Danh Dũng & Trịnh Lê Phong	VTV1
2020	Lựa chọn số phận	Thiên Trang	Mai Hồng Phong	VTV1
2021	Hương vị tình thân	Phương Nam	Nguyễn Danh Dũng	VTV1
