= Merited Artist =

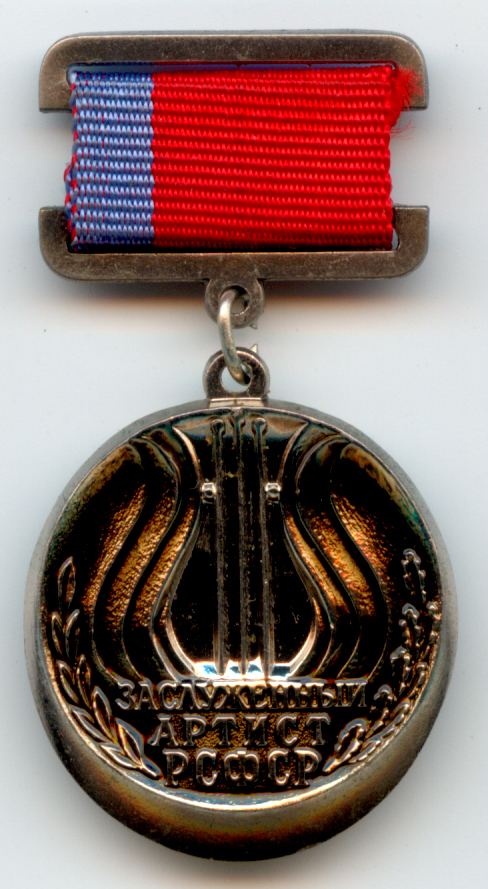
Honored Artist of the RSFSR medal

Merited Artist, Honored Artist, etc., is an honorary title in the Soviet Union, Russian Federation, Union Republics, and autonomous republics, also in some other Eastern Bloc states, as well as in a number of post-Soviet states. In Russian language, the word artist is a "false friend": in Russian it corresponds both to художник ("artist") and артист ("actor"), see *Honored Artist of the RSFSR vs. Honored Artist of the RSFSR (visual arts) .

Specifically, the term may refer to:

- Merited Artist (Albania)
- Merited Artist of the Russian Federation
- Merited Artist of Ukraine
- Merited Artist of Vietnam
- Honored Artist of Armenia
- Honored Artist of the Azerbaijan SSR
- Honored Artist of the Byelorussian SSR
- Honored Artist of the RSFSR (performing arts)
- Honored Artist of the RSFSR (visual arts)
- Honored Artist of Uzbekistan
