= Hoàng Hải (actor) =

Vietnamese actor

Meritorious Artist Hoàng Hải
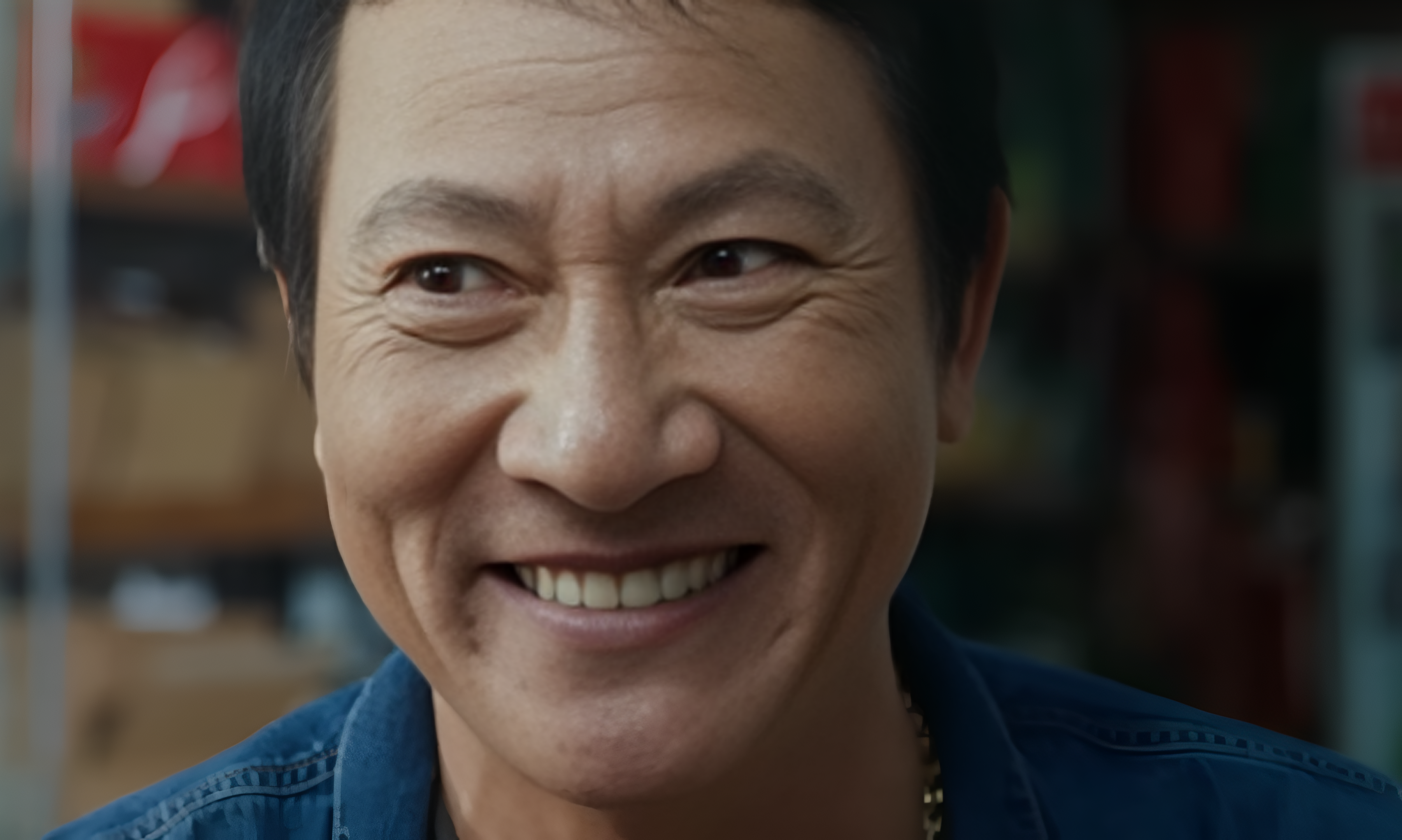
- Hoàng Hải in 2024
- Born: Hoàng Thanh Hải; June 28, 1968 (age 58); Hanoi, Vietnam
- Occupation: Actor
- Title: Meritorious Artist (2012)

Hoàng Hải is a Vietnamese actor. He was awarded the title of Meritorious Artist in 2012 and is remembered by the audience for his role as Lieutenant Trần Minh in the long-running series Criminal Police, and Hải in Đường đời (The Road of Life).

== Biography ==
Hoàng Hải, full name Hoàng Thanh Hải, was born on June 28, 1968, in Hanoi, the second child in a family of 4 brothers. He was born in Hanoi but his hometown is in Da Nang. He studied and graduated from the University of Theater and Cinema.

== Career ==
After graduating, Hải became an actor for the Hanoi Drama Theater and worked as a supporting actor for People's Artist Hoàng Dũng. Whenever teacher Hoàng Dũng was absent, he was put on to perform instead. At the end of the subsidy period, the low salary of an actor made life difficult, and Hải did many other jobs such as trading and driving long-distance cars from North to South.

When his family moved back to his hometown in Đà Nẵng, he joined the Quảng Nam – Đà Nẵng Drama Troupe, but after less than a year the troupe was dissolved and merged into the Đà Nẵng Song and Dance Troupe. During this time, he often went to Hanoi to act in films and then became a freelance actor because in the song and dance troupe, he was not able to perform music.

== Family ==
Hoang Hai is married and has four children, two girls and two boys.
