= List of dramas broadcast by Vietnam Television =

This is a list of television dramas broadcast by Vietnam Television (VTV), including award ceremonies. Dramas broadcast but not produced by the television station are displayed smaller or excluded from the list depending on the time slot it aired.

== SD Format ==
=== Without Prime-time ===
During this stage, Vietnamese drama series did not air in certain prime time slot of its own but interleaved with foreign dramas series. However, there was still a recurrent weekend afternoon time slot created in 1994 for Vietnamese dramas.

- List of VTV films broadcast in 1982-1993
- List of VTV dramas broadcast in 1994
- List of VTV dramas broadcast in 1995
- List of VTV dramas broadcast in 1996
- List of VTV dramas broadcast in 1997
- List of VTV dramas broadcast in 1998
- List of VTV dramas broadcast in 1999
- List of VTV dramas broadcast in 2000
- List of VTV dramas broadcast in 2001
- List of VTV dramas broadcast in 2002
- List of VTV dramas broadcast in 2003
- List of VTV dramas broadcast in 2004
- List of VTV dramas broadcast in 2005
- List of VTV dramas broadcast in 2006

=== With Prime-time ===
Under the effect of 2007 Cinema Law, VTV opened the prime time slot for Vietnamese dramas. The VTV1 and VTV3 prime time slots was launched on 20 September 2007 and 11 February 2008, respectively.

- List of VTV dramas broadcast in 2007
- List of VTV dramas broadcast in 2008
- List of VTV dramas broadcast in 2009
- List of VTV dramas broadcast in 2010
- List of VTV dramas broadcast in 2011
- List of VTV dramas broadcast in 2012

== HD Format ==
An HD version of VTV3 was launched on 31 March 2013. This channel is the first channel in VTV to broadcast in High Definition.

Following that, HD versions of VTV6 and VTV1 was launched on 7 September 2013 and 31 March 2014, respectively.

The other VTV channels' HD versions was launched in 2015.

- List of VTV dramas broadcast in 2013
- List of VTV dramas broadcast in 2014
- List of VTV dramas broadcast in 2015
- List of VTV dramas broadcast in 2016
- List of VTV dramas broadcast in 2017
- List of VTV dramas broadcast in 2018
- List of VTV dramas broadcast in 2019
- List of VTV dramas broadcast in 2020
- List of VTV dramas broadcast in 2021
- List of VTV dramas broadcast in 2022
- List of VTV dramas broadcast in 2023
- List of VTV dramas broadcast in 2024
- List of VTV dramas broadcast in 2025
- List of VTV dramas broadcast in 2026
- List of VTV dramas broadcast in 2027
- List of VTV dramas broadcast in 2028
- List of VTV dramas broadcast in 2029
- List of VTV dramas broadcast in 2030
- List of VTV dramas broadcast in 2031

== Sitcoms ==
- Nhật ký Vàng Anh (Vàng Anh Diary; 2006-2007 | VTV3)
- Nhật ký Vàng Anh 2 (Vàng Anh Diary 2; 2007 | VTV3)
- Bộ tứ 10A8 (The Four of 10A8; 2009-2012 | VTV3)
- Những phóng viên vui nhộn (Hilarious Reporters; 2010-2012 | VTV3)
- Camera công sở (The Office Camera; 2010-2011 | VTV3)
- Cửa số thủy tinh (Crystal Window; 2012-2013 | VTV3)
- 5S Online (2013-2016 | VTV6)
- Tiệm bánh hoàng tử bé (Little Prince Bakery; 2013-2015 | VTV9)
- Gái ngoan truyền kỳ (Myth of Good Girls; 2013-2015 | VTV3)
- Sắc màu phái đẹp (Colors of the Fairs; 2014-2020 | VTV3)
- Phụ nữ là số 1 (Women is Number 1; 2014–present | VTV3)
- Bótay.kom (2015-2018 | VTV3-VTV6)
- Yêu là phải lấy (Marry Who You Love; 2016 | VTV3)
- Làm giàu cực khó (Getting Rich Is So Hard; 2016 | VTV3)
- Nhà nông vui vẻ (Happy Farmers; 2017–present | VTV2-VTV3)
- Chung cư loạn truyện (Apartment's Hysterical Stories; 2017-2018 | VTV3)
- Cư dân thông thái (Knowledgeable Residents; 2017-2018 | VTV6)
- Gia đình 4.0 (The 4.0 Family; 2018-2020 | VTV2)
- Đen thôi, đỏ quên đi (Just Bad Luck, Don't Mind; 2018-2019 | vtvgiaitri-VTV3)
- Thả thính là dính (Clickbait; 2019 | vtvgiaitri-VTV3)
- Những thiên thần nhà S6 (Angels in Apartment S6; 2019 | vtvgiaitri-VTV3)
- Làm giàu không khó (Getting Rich Is Not So Hard; 2020 | VTV3)
- Ba chàng ngốc (Three Idiots; 2020 | VTV2)
- Góc phố muôn màu (Colorful Street Corner; 2020–2023 | VTV3)
- Khu dân cư rắc rối (Troubled Neighbors; 2020 | VTV3)
- Hoa nắng vùng cao (Highlands Sunshine; 2021 | VTV5)
- Kỳ nghỉ trên bản Leng Keng (The Vacation on Leng Keng Village; 2021 | VTV5)
- Sao phải xoắn (Big Deal!; 2022 | VTV3)
- Gia đình đại chiến - Mùa 1 (Great War of Family - Season 1; 2022–2023 | VTV3)
- Gia đình đại chiến - Mùa 2 (Great War of Family - Season 2; 2023 | VTV3)
- Con đến đây (Come Here, Child; 2026 | VTV3)

== Awards ==
=== Awards for "The Most Beloved VTV Dramas" Voting Contest ===
Starting in 2003, 'The Most Beloved Vietnam Television Dramas' Voting Contest (Vietnamese: Cuộc thi bình chọn phim truyền hình Việt Nam được yêu thích nhất) is held annually or biennially by VTV Television Magazine to honor Vietnamese television dramas broadcast during the year(s) on two channels VTV1-VTV3.

indicates the winner

Year	Winner & Nominees	Production Company(s)
2003
2003	Khi đàn chim trở về (When the Birds Return)	VTV Film Center (VFC)
2003	Cảnh sát hình sự: Phía sau một cái chết (Criminal Police: Behind a Case of Death)	VTV Film Center (VFC)
2003	Phía trước là bầu trời (Ahead is the Sky)	VTV Film Center (VFC)
2003	Đất và người (The Land and the People)	VTV Film Center (VFC)
2003	Những người sống bên tôi (People Around Me)	VTV Film Center (VFC)
2004
2004	Đường đời (Walks of Life)	VTV Film Center (VFC)
2004	Những giấc mơ dài (Endless Dreams)	VTV Film Center (VFC)
2004	Cảnh sát hình sự: Thế giới không đàn bà (Criminal Police: World Without Women)	VTV Film Center (VFC)
2005-2006
2005-2006	Cảnh sát hình sự: Chạy án (Criminal Police: Cheating Justice)	VTV Film Center (VFC)
2005-2006	Hương đất (Scent of the Soil)	VTV Film Center (VFC)
2005-2006	Gió mùa thổi mãi (Unceasing Monsoon)	VTV Film Center (VFC)
2005-2006	Đèn vàng (Yellow Light)	VTV Film Center (VFC)
2005-2006	Ngọn nến hoàng cung (Candle in the Royal Palace)	Hồ Chí Minh City Television Film Studios (TFS)
2007
2007	Luật đời (Rules of Life)	VTV Film Center (VFC)
2007	Ma làng (Ghosts of the Village)	VTV Film Center (VFC)
2007	Phóng viên thử việc (Trainee Reporters)	VTV Film Center (VFC)
2008-2009
2008-2009	Bỗng dưng muốn khóc (Suddenly I Wanna Cry)	BHD Vietnam Media Corp
2008-2009	Cô gái xấu xí (Ugly Miracle)	VTV and BHD Vietnam Media Corp
2008-2009	Cảnh sát hình sự: Chạy án 2 (Criminal Police: Cheating Justice 2)	VTV Film Center (VFC)
2008-2009	Lập trình cho trái tim (Programming for the Heart)	FPT Media
2008-2009	Ngõ lỗ thủng (The Lane of Loopholes)	VTV Film Center (VFC)
2010
2010	Bí thư tỉnh ủy (Provincial Party Secretary)	VTV Film Center (VFC)
2010	Blog nàng dâu (Bride's Blog)	VTV Film Center (VFC)
2010	Cuồng phong (The Storm)	Lasta Film and Vietnam Feature Film Studio (VFS)
2011-2012
2011-2012	Cầu vồng tình yêu (Rainbow of Love)	VTV Film Center (VFC)

=== VTV Awards ===
VTV Awards (Vietnamese: Ấn tượng VTV) is an annual awards ceremony, launched in 2014, to honour remarkable programmes and figures who appeared on Vietnam Television (VTV) channels during the year (from last August to next July). The winners will be determined by audiences’ votes on the official website of the awards, http://www.antuong.vtv.vn, and the jury's scores.

==== Impressive Drama Awards ====
indicates the winner
indicates nominations made it to the top three

Year	Winner & Nominees	Production Company(s)
2013-2014
2013-2014	Vừa đi vừa khóc (Walking Crying)	BHD Vietnam Media Corp
2013-2014	Chạm tay vào nỗi nhớ (A Touch to Remember)	VTV Film Center (VFC)
2013-2014	Chỉ có thể là yêu (It Must be Love)	VTV Film Center (VFC)
2013-2014	Hoa nở trái mùa (Unseasonal Bloom)	VTV Film Center (VFC)
2013-2014	Trò đời (Human Comedy)	VTV Film Center (VFC) and Hodafilm
2014-2015
2014-2015	Tuổi thanh xuân (Forever Young)	VTV Film Center (VFC) and CJ E&M Pictures
2014-2015	Đam mê nghiệt ngã (Severe Passion)	BHD Vietnam Media Corp
2014-2015	Mưa bóng mây (Sunshower)	VTV Film Center (VFC)
2014-2015	Trái tim có nắng (Sunshine in My Heart)	VTV Film Center (VFC)
2014-2015	Bão qua làng (Stormy Village)	VTV Film Center (VFC)
2015-2016
2015-2016	Zippo, mù tạt và em (Zippo, Mustard and You)	VTV Film Center (VFC)
2015-2016	Khúc hát mặt trời (A Song to the Sun)	VTV Film Center (VFC) and Tokyo Broadcasting System (TBS)
2015-2016	Bạch mã hoàng tử (Prince Charming)	VTV Film Center (VFC)
2015-2016	Những ngọn nến trong đêm 2 (Candles in the Night 2)	VTV Film Center (VFC) and Tincom Media
2015-2016	Nguyệt thực (Eclipse)	VTV and THL Media Corp
2016-2017
2016-2017	Người phán xử (The Arbitrator)	VTV Film Center (VFC)
2016-2017	Tuổi thanh xuân 2 (Forever Young 2)	VTV Film Center (VFC) and CJ E&M Pictures
2016-2017	Sống chung với mẹ chồng (Living with Mother-in-Law)	VTV Film Center (VFC)
2016-2017	Mátxcơva - Mùa thay lá (Moscow in Season of Falling Leaves)	VTV Film Center (VFC)
2016-2017	Ngự lâm không kiếm (Musketeer Without Sword)	M&T Pictures
2017-2018
2017-2018	Cả một đời ân oán (Life of Love and Feud)	VTV Film Center (VFC)
2017-2018	Ghét thì yêu thôi (I Love You Because I Hate You)	VTV Film Center (VFC)
2017-2018	Cung đường tội lỗi (The Way of Sins)	MegaGS
2017-2018	Mộng phù hoa (Sumptuous Dream)	Khang Viet Film
2017-2018	Ngày ấy mình đã yêu (Those Days We Fell in Love)	VTV Film Center (VFC)
2018-2019
2018-2019	Về nhà đi con (Come Home, My Dear)	VTV Film Center (VFC)
2018-2019	Quỳnh búp bê (Quỳnh the Doll)	VTV Film Center (VFC)
2018-2019	Chạy trốn thanh xuân (Run Away From Youth)	VTV Film Center (VFC)
2018-2019	Những cô gái trong thành phố (Girls in the city)	VTV Film Center (VFC)
2018-2019	Cảnh sát hình sự: Mê cung (Criminal Police: The Labyrinth)	VTV Film Center (VFC)
2019-2020
2019-2020	Hoa hồng trên ngực trái (Roses on the Left Chest)	VTV Film Center (VFC)
2019-2020	Sinh tử (Life and Death)	VTV Film Center (VFC)
2019-2020	Tình yêu và tham vọng (Love and Ambition)	VTV Film Center (VFC)
2019-2020	Nhà trọ Balanha (Balanha Homestay)	VTV Film Center (VFC)
2019-2020	Những ngày không quên (Unforgettable Days)	VTV Film Center (VFC)
2020-2021
2020-2021	Hương vị tình thân (The Taste of Intimacy)	VTV Film Center (VFC)
2020-2021	Hướng dương ngược nắng (Extraordinary Sunflowers)	VTV Film Center (VFC)
2020-2021	Mùa hoa tìm lại (Rebloom)	VTV Film Center (VFC)
2020-2021	Thương con cá rô đồng (Mercy on the Anabas)	MegaGS
2020-2021	Yêu hơn cả bầu trời (Sky-high Love)	VTV Film Center (VFC)
2021-2022
2021-2022	Thương ngày nắng về (Cherish the Sunny Day)	VTV Film Center (VFC)
2021-2022	11 tháng 5 ngày (11 Months 5 Days)	VTV Film Center (VFC)
2021-2022	Đấu trí (Mind Games)	VTV Film Center (VFC)
2021-2022	Ga-ra hạnh phúc (The Garage of Happiness)	VTV Film Center (VFC)
2021-2022	Hành trình công lý (Journey to Justice)	VTV Film Center (VFC)
2022-2023
2022-2023	Gia đình mình vui bất thình lình (Suddenly Happy Family)	VTV Film Center (VFC)
2022-2023	Cuộc đời vẫn đẹp sao (How Beautiful Life is Still)	VTV Film Center (VFC)
2022-2023	Đừng làm mẹ cáu (Don't Vex a Mom!)	VTV Film Center (VFC)
2022-2023	Cảnh sát hình sự: Biệt dược đen (Criminal Police: Dark Drugs)	VTV Film Center (VFC)
2022-2023	Cuộc chiến không giới tuyến (Borderless Battle)	VTV Film Center (VFC)
2023-2024
2023-2024	Cảnh sát hình sự: Độc đạo (Criminal Police: The Only Way)	VTV Film Center (VFC)
2023-2024	Gặp em ngày nắng (Meet You on a Sunny Day)	VTV Film Center (VFC)
2023-2024	Trạm cứu hộ trái tim (Heart Rescue Station)	VTV Film Center (VFC)

==== Impressive Actor/Actress Awards ====
Table key
‡	Indicates the winner
†	Indicates nominations made it to the top three

Ceremony	Winning & Nominated Actor	Winning & Nominated Actress
2015
2015	Kang Tae-oh ‡ (as Junsu in Tuổi thanh xuân)	Nhã Phương ‡ (as Thùy Linh in Tuổi thanh xuân)
2015	Hồng Đăng (as Khánh in Tuổi thanh xuân)	Shin Hye-sun (as Miso in Tuổi thanh xuân)
2015	M.A. Trọng Trinh (as Tài in Mưa bóng mây)	Thúy Hà (as Bích in Mưa bóng mây)
2015	Huy Khánh (as Hải in Đam mê nghiệt ngã)	Phan Minh Huyền (as Lan in Lời thì thầm từ quá khứ & Linh in Trái tim có nắng)
2015	Đỗ Duy Nam (as Thắng in Sóng ngầm)	P.A. Như Quỳnh (as Mrs. Mai in Sóng ngầm)
2016
2016	Hồng Đăng ‡ (as Huy in Zippo, mù tạt và em)	Nhã Phương ‡ (as Yến Phương in Khúc hát mặt trời & young Lam in Zippo, mù tạt và em)
2016	Chí Nhân (as Khang in Hôn nhân trong ngõ hẹp, Linh "đù" in Cảnh sát hình sự: Câu hỏi số 5 & Khắc Đức in Lựa chọn cuối cùng)	Diễm Hương (as Hằng in Hôn nhân trong ngõ hẹp)
2016	Việt Anh (as Thành in Khi đàn chim trở về 3)	Ninh Dương Lan Ngọc (as Mỹ Khanh in Nguyệt thực)
2016	Mạnh Trường (as Hữu Khánh in Người đứng trong gió & Sơn in Zippo, mù tạt và em)	Cao Thái Hà (as Kim Oanh in Đồng tiền quỷ ám)
2016	Bình Minh (as Quốc in Những ngọn nến trong đêm 2)	Mai Thu Huyền (as Trúc in Những ngọn nến trong đêm 2)
2017
2017	P.A. Hoàng Dũng ‡ (as Phan Quân in Người phán xử)	Bảo Thanh ‡ (as Minh Vân in Sống chung với mẹ chồng & Quỳnh in Hợp đồng hôn nhân)
2017	Kang Tae-oh (as Junsu in Tuổi thanh xuân 2)	Nhã Phương (as Thùy Linh in Tuổi thanh xuân 2)
2017	Bảo Anh (as Bảo "ngậu" in Người phán xử)	Thanh Hương (as Phan Hương in Người phán xử)
2017	Hồng Đăng (as Minh in Mátxcơva - Mùa thay lá & Lê Thành in Người phán xử)	Hồng Diễm (as Phương in Mátxcơva - Mùa thay lá)
2017	M.A. Trung Anh (as Lương 'Bổng' in Người phán xử)	M.A. Kim Oanh (as Mai Hoa in Chiều ngang qua phố cũ)
2018
2018	Hồng Đăng ‡ (as Phong in Cả một đời ân oán)	Lan Phương ‡ (as Diệu in Cả một đời ân oán)
2018	Mạnh Trường (as Thành in Ngược chiều nước mắt & Đăng in Cả một đời ân oán)	Hồng Diễm (as Dung in Cả một đời ân oán)
2018	Lê Vũ Long (as Quang in Tình khúc bạch dương)	Thanh Hương (as Nương in Thương nhớ ở ai)
2018	Nhan Phúc Vinh (as Tùng in Ngày ấy mình đã yêu)	Nhã Phương (as Hạ in Ngày ấy mình đã yêu)
2018	Chí Thiện (as Đô in Ngày ấy mình đã yêu)	Bảo Thanh (as Sol in Ngày ấy mình đã yêu)
2019
2019	P.A. Trung Anh ‡ (as Mr. Sơn in Về nhà đi con)	Bảo Thanh ‡ (as Anh Thư in Về nhà đi con)
2019	Huỳnh Anh (as Phi in Chạy trốn thanh xuân)	Ninh Dương Lan Ngọc (as An Chi in Mối tình đầu của tôi)
2019	Doãn Quốc Đam (as Cảnh in Quỳnh búp bê & Fedora/"Fotomat" Long Nhật in Cảnh sát hình sự: Mê cung)	Thu Quỳnh (as My "sói" in Quỳnh búp bê & Thu Huệ in Về nhà đi con)
2019	Hồng Đăng (as Major Nguyễn Minh Khánh in Cảnh sát hình sự: Mê cung)	Thanh Hương (as Lan in Quỳnh búp bê & Linh in Nàng dâu order)
2019	Quốc Trường (as Vũ in Về nhà đi con)	Bảo Hân (as Ánh Dương in Về nhà đi con)
2020
2020	Xuân Nghị ‡ (as Cao Minh Bách in Nhà trọ Balanha)	Hồng Diễm ‡ (as Khuê in Hoa hồng trên ngực trái)
2020	Thanh Sơn (as Duy in Đừng bắt em phải quên & Sơn in Tình yêu và tham vọng)	Quỳnh Kool (as Ngọc in Đừng bắt em phải quên & Nhi in Nhà trọ Balanha)
2020	Nhan Phúc Vinh (as Trần Nguyên Minh in Tình yêu và tham vọng)	Diễm My (as Phan Hoàng Linh in Tình yêu và tham vọng)
2020	Mạnh Trường (as Prosecutor Bùi Tiến Huy in Sinh tử & Kiều Phong in Tình yêu và tham vọng)	Lã Thanh Huyền (as Tuệ Lâm in Tình yêu và tham vọng)
2020	Việt Anh (as Mai Hồng Vũ in Sinh tử)	Phương Oanh (as Uyên in Cô gái nhà người ta)
2021
2021	Mạnh Trường ‡ (as Hải in Cảnh sát hình sự: Hồ sơ cá sấu & Long in Hương vị tình thân)	Hồng Diễm ‡ (as Cao Minh Châu in Hướng dương ngược nắng)
2021	Việt Anh (as Đặng Trung in Cảnh sát hình sự: Hồ sơ cá sấu & Hoàng in Hướng dương ngược nắng)	Lương Thu Trang (as Cao Dương Minh in Hướng dương ngược nắng)
2021	Hồng Đăng (as Kiên in Hướng dương ngược nắng)	P.A. Thu Hà (as Mrs. Bạch Cúc in Hướng dương ngược nắng)
2021	Thanh Sơn (as Thiên in Yêu hơn cả bầu trời)	Thúy Diễm (as Nhớ in Cát đỏ)
2021	Công Dương (as Phan in Hãy nói lời yêu)	Tú Oanh (as Mrs. Bích in Hương vị tình thân)
2022
2022	Thanh Sơn ‡ (as Hải Đăng in 11 tháng 5 ngày & Captain Lê Anh Vũ in Đấu trí)	Phan Minh Huyền ‡ (as Vân Trang in Thương ngày nắng về)
2022	Doãn Quốc Đam † (as Mến in Phố trong làng & Đông Phong in Thương ngày nắng về)	Khả Ngân † (as Tuệ Nhi in 11 tháng 5 ngày)
2022	Nhan Phúc Vinh † (as Tuấn Khang in Anh có phải đàn ông không)	Hồng Diễm † (as Phương in Hành trình công lý)
2022	Đình Tú (as Hoàng Duy in Thương ngày nắng về)	Ngọc Lan (as Ngọc Diễm in Cảnh sát hình sự: Mặt nạ gương & Hồng in Mẹ rơm)
2022	Bảo Anh (as Captain Nghiêm Đức Tùng in Cảnh sát hình sự: Mặt nạ gương & Khải in Ga-ra hạnh phúc)	Quỳnh Kool (as Vy in Anh có phải đàn ông không & Sơn Ca in Ga-ra hạnh phúc)
2023
2023	Nhan Phúc Vinh ‡ (as Đức Quân in Đừng làm mẹ cáu & Bảo Phong in Không ngại cưới, chỉ cần một lý do)	M.A. Kiều Anh ‡ (as Bảo Phương in Gia đình mình vui bất thình lình)
2023	M.A. Hoàng Hải † (as Lưu "nát" in Cuộc đời vẫn đẹp sao & Lieutenant Colonel Nguyễn Minh Quang in Cuộc chiến không giới tuyến)	Khả Ngân † (as Trâm Anh in Gia đình mình vui bất thình lình)
2023	Trọng Lân † (as Đình Đông in Không ngại cưới, chỉ cần một lý do & Khải in Gia đình mình vui bất thình lình)	Lan Phương † (as Ngọc Hà in Gia đình mình vui bất thình lình)
2023	Đỗ Duy Nam (as Đạt “điên” in Cảnh sát hình sự: Biệt dược đen)	Thanh Hương (as Luyến "lươn" in Cuộc đời vẫn đẹp sao)
2023	M.A. Võ Hoài Nam (as Mr. Nhân in Món quà của cha)	Quỳnh Kool (as Minh Hạnh in Đừng làm mẹ cáu)
2023	Mạnh Trường (as Kim Quy in Đừng nói khi yêu)	Thu Quỳnh (as Lang Phương in Cuộc chiến không giới tuyến)
2024
2024	Duy Hưng ‡ (as Trí in Người một nhà & Khương "liều" in Độc đạo)	Thanh Hương ‡ (as Khanh in Người một nhà & Linh in Hoa sữa về trong gió)
2024	Quang Sự (as Nghĩa in Trạm cứu hộ trái tim)	Lương Thu Trang (as An Nhiên in Trạm cứu hộ trái tim)
2024	Nguyễn Long Vũ (as Chải in Đi giữa trời rực rỡ)	Hoàng Hà (as Mai Dương in Chúng ta của 8 năm sau)

- Note: P.A. is short for People's Artist, M.A. is short for Merited Artist. These titles are granted to certain Vietnamese artists by the Government.

== See also ==
- List of dramas broadcast by Hanoi Radio Television (HanoiTV)
- List of dramas broadcast by Vietnam Digital Television (VTC)
