= 2022 VTV Awards =

Edition of Vietnam TV awards show

- Date: January 1, 2023
- Site: Studio S14, VTV Headquarters, Ngọc Khánh Ward, Ba Đình District, Hanoi
- Hosted by: Đức Bảo, Trần Ngọc, Linh Thủy

Television coverage
- Network: VTV1
- Duration: 155 minutes

The 2022 VTV Awards (Vietnamese: Ấn tượng VTV 2022) is a ceremony honouring the outstanding achievement in television on the Vietnam Television (VTV) network from August 2021 to November 2022. This year, all activities for the award ceremony had not been launched until the 52nd anniversary of VTV establishment on September 7. It was announced that the ceremony is officially moved to January 1, produced as a New Year show from now on.

Unlike last year, there are 12 award categories instead of 11. Two categories per week with 10 nominees of each will be revealed from September 7 to October 12. After that, the Voting Round 1 will start in order to pick out the Top 5. The nominated list will be cut down to Top 3 before the winner was crowned.

== Winners and nominees ==
(Top 3 are listed first with the winners denoted in bold)

Impressive Drama
**Thương ngày nắng về (Cherish the Sunny Day)**; 11 tháng 5 ngày (11 Months 5 Days); Đấu trí (Mind Games); Ga-ra hạnh phúc (The Garage of Happiness); Hành trình công lý (Journey to Justice)
Impressive Actor	Impressive Actress
**Thanh Sơn - 11 tháng 5 ngày (11 Months 5 Days), Đấu trí (Mind Games)**; Doãn Quốc Đam - Phố trong làng (Street in the Village), Thương ngày nắng về (Cherish the Sunny Day); Nhan Phúc Vinh - Anh có phải đàn ông không (So You Call Yourself a Man?); Đình Tú - Thương ngày nắng về (Cherish the Sunny Day); Bảo Anh - Cảnh sát hình sự: Mặt nạ gương (Criminal Police: Mirror Mask), Ga-ra hạnh phúc (The Garage of Happiness)	**Phan Minh Huyền - Thương ngày nắng về (Cherish the Sunny Day)**; Khả Ngân - 11 tháng 5 ngày (11 Months 5 Days); Hồng Diễm - Hành trình công lý (Journey to Justice); Ngọc Lan - Cảnh sát hình sự: Mặt nạ gương (Criminal Police: Mirror Mask), Mẹ rơm (Straw Mother); Quỳnh Kool - Anh có phải đàn ông không (So You Call Yourself a Man?), Ga-ra hạnh phúc (The Garage of Happiness)
Impressive TV Presenter	Promising Artist
**Đức Bảo**; Trần Ngọc; Linh Thủy; Lan Anh; Minh Hằng	**Mỹ Anh - singer, songwriter**; Nguyễn Ngọc Huyền - actress; Hứa Kim Tuyền - songwriter; Lona Kiều Loan - rapper, singer, beauty pageant titleholder; Hà Trung - actor, comedian
Radiating Image
**Bình yên con nhé**; Nâng niu đưa chữ tới trường; Vượt lên khó khăn để học tập trong đại dịch; Người hùng trong lòng nhân dân; Người cha nuôi 131 em nhỏ có hoàn cảnh khó khăn
Impressive News Report	Impressive Education/Children's Program
**Mua bán ma túy tại trung tâm điều trị Methadone**; "Bắt tay" phá rừng; Hàng chục khu đô thị bỏ hoang trên một huyện; 47 năm nuôi con đồng đội; Mưa ngập lịch sử tại TP Đà Nẵng	**Chung kết Đường lên đỉnh Olympia năm 2022**; Biệt đội siêu nhân nhí: Công dụng của Vitamin C; Cuộc thi sơ đồ tư duy Việt Nam 2022 (giải đồng đội); Cất cánh: Mầm hy vọng; Chung kết Trạng nguyên nhí
Impressive Culture/Sport Program	Impressive Entertainment Program
**Gala Việc tử tế 2022: Vì đất nước cần những trái tim**; Thanh xuân tươi đẹp: Chuyện của mùa thu; Vượt ngưỡng: Nguyễn Linh Na; Góc nhìn văn hóa: Câu view, câu like; Sao Mai 2022: Sao Mai hội tụ	**Cuộc hẹn cuối tuần: Nghệ sĩ Đen Vâu**; Vua Tiếng Việt: Vua Tiếng Việt đầu tiên lên ngai vàng!; Cơ hội cho ai: Cô gái dân tộc thiểu số thay đổi cuộc đời bằng con đường học vấn; Đời nghệ sĩ: Ca sỹ Ngọc Ánh; Ký ức vui vẻ: Biệt động Sài Gòn
Impressive Documentary	Program of the Year
**Bốn mùa trong rừng thẳm**; Đường tới bình yên; Hồ Chí Minh – Theo dấu chân Người; Chuyện của mùa yêu trước; Cuộc chiến giữa thời bình	**Khúc tráng ca hòa bình**; Đón tết cùng VTV 2022: Và hoa sẽ nở; VTV Đặc biệt: Ranh giới; Chiều cuối năm: An; Gặp nhau cuối năm: Táo quân 2022

== Presenters/Awarders ==
Order	Presenter/Awarder	Performed
1	Nguyễn Thanh Lâm	Impressive News Report
2	Thụy Vân	Promising Artist
3	Bùi Phương Nga & Trần Thành Nam	Impressive Education/Children's Program
4	Thu Hà & Quyền Linh	Impressive Actor
5	Tạ Quang Đông & Đỗ Thị Ngọc Châm	Impressive Culture/Sport Program
6	Thu Minh & Tuấn Dương	Impressive TV Presenter
7	Huy Tuấn & Thanh Thúy	Radiating Image
8	Xuân Bắc & Nhã Phương	Impressive Entertainment Program
9	Trọng Trinh & Tóc Tiên	Impressive Actress
10	Nguyễn Khải Hưng	Impressive Documentary
11	Đỗ Thanh Hải	Impressive Drama
12	Lê Ngọc Quang	Program of the Year

== Special performances ==
Order	Artist	Performed
1	Bình An, Bùi Phương Nga, Quỳnh Lương, Tuấn Tú, Danh Tùng, Chử Phương Thúy	"Năm qua đã làm gì"
2	Vietnam Youth Symphony Orchestra	The Suite "Thiên Thanh"
3	Hoàng Tôn & Vũ Thảo My	Mash-up: "Khúc giao mùa", "Happy New Year"
4	Ali Hoàng Dương & Orange	Trịnh Công Sơn Medley: "Nắng thủy tinh", "Nhìn những mùa thu đi", "Tình nhớ"
5	Hoàng Dũng (with Thành Công A Primary School's students)	"Tôi muốn làm cái cây"
6	Tóc Tiên	"906090"
7	Đồng Quang Vinh, Sức Sống Mới Folk Orchestra, VNAMYO Symphony Orchestra	"Gà gáy sáng", "'O sole mio"
8	Bùi Dương Thái Hà (with Thành Công A Primary School's students)	"Người gieo mầm xanh"
9	Phạm Đình Thái Ngân & Ly Ly	Mash-up: "Waiting For You", "Hẹn ước từ hư vô", "Cô đơn trên sofa", "See Tình"
10	Thu Minh	"Dưới ánh đèn sân khấu"
11	Mỹ Anh	"Có hẹn với thanh xuân"
12	Hải Yến Idol & Phạm Anh Duy	"Sẽ chưa là quá muộn" (Chồng cũ, vợ cũ, người yêu cũ OST) "Bất chấp" (Ga-ra hạnh phúc OST)
13	Thùy Chi	"Việt Nam trong tôi là"
14	Ali Hoàng Dương, Hải Yến Idol & Phạm Anh Duy	"Xin chào! Xin chào!"
