= 2021 Kite Awards =

Vietnamese cinema awards event

2021 Kite Awards (29th VCA Awards)
- Date: September 13, 2022
- Site: Khánh Hòa Provincial Convention Center, Nha Trang City, Khánh Hòa Province
- Hosted by: Hồng Phúc, Thụy Vân
- Organised by: Vietnam Cinema Association

Highlights
- Most wins: Film: The Brilliant Darkness! (5); Red Dawn (5); Television: 11 Months 5 Days (3)
- Golden Kite: Film: The Brilliant Darkness! Television: 11 Months 5 Days; Cherish the Sunny Day - Part 1 -
- Silver Kite: Film: Maika: The Girl from Another Galaxy; Red Dawn; Television: When the Apple Tree Blooms; The Taste of Intimacy

Television/radio coverage
- Network: VTV9

The 2021 Kite Awards (Vietnamese: Giải Cánh diều 2021) is the 29th edition of Vietnam Cinema Association Awards, also the 20th edition since the award is officially named Kite. It honored the best in Vietnam film, television works of 2021.

Due to the prolonged effects of the COVID-19 epidemic, the Association had not been able to hold the 2020 Kite Award ceremony until December 2021. That causes the time to hold the 2021 Kite Awards ceremony to be postponed to mid-2022 instead of March as tradition.

This year, a total of 147 works participated in the award, including: 12 feature films, 14 TV drama series, 45 documentaries, 10 science films, 28 animated films, 35 short films and 3 film studies.

On September 13, the winners are announced. In the feature film category, The Brilliant Darkness! won the most with 5 included Golden Kite, Red Dawn also won 5 along with a promising acting award. Meanwhile, 11 Months 5 Days and Cherish the Sunny Day - Part 1 - are both awarded Golden Kite for television films.

== Winner and nominees ==
Winners are listed first, highlighted in boldface, with a dagger (†) indicating the shortlist nominees for the Golden Kite.

- Highlighted title indicates Golden Kite for the Best Film/Drama/Study winner(s).
- Highlighted title indicates Silver Kite for the Second Best Film/Drama/Study winner(s).
- Highlighted title indicates Film/Drama/Study(s) received the Certificate of Merit.
  - Other nominees

=== Feature film ===
**Best Film**
**The Brilliant Darkness!** †; **Maika: The Girl from Another Galaxy** †; **Red Dawn** †; **Naked Truth** †; **Burning Flamboyant** †; Survive; A Hundred Billion Key; House Not For Sale; Extremely Easy Job; Listeners: The Whispering; Thunderstorm; Face Off: 48 Hours
**Best Director**	**Best Screenplay**
**Nguyễn Thanh Vân**, **Trần Chí Thành** – **Red Dawn**	**The Brilliant Darkness! – Lý Nguyễn Nhã Uyên**
**Best Leading Actor**	**Best Leading Actress**
**Lại Trường Phú – Maika: The Girl from Another Galaxy as Hùng**; Quốc Trường – Naked Truth as Đăng Minh; Kiều Minh Tuấn – A Hundred Billion Key as Phan Thạch	**Lý Nguyễn Nhã Uyên – The Brilliant Darkness! as Xuân Thanh**; Chu Diệp Anh – Maika: The Girl from Another Galaxy as Maika; Thu Trang – A Hundred Billion Key as Mai Mai
**Best Supporting Actor**	**Best Supporting Actress**
**Xuân Trang – The Brilliant Darkness! as Kim Hoàng**	**Bảo Hân – Red Dawn as Sa**
**Best Cinematography**	**Best Art Design**
**Nguyễn Khắc Nhật**, **Dominic Pereira** – **The Brilliant Darkness!**	**Nguyễn Nguyên Vũ – Red Dawn**
**Best Original Score**	**Best Sound Design**
**Đặng Hữu Phúc – Red Dawn**	**Hoàng Thu Thủy**, **Nguyễn Đình Cảnh** – **Red Dawn**
**Promising Actress**
**Phạm Quỳnh Anh – Red Dawn as Châu**

==== Multiple wins ====
The following films received multiple wins:

Wins	Films
5	The Brilliant Darkness!
5	Red Dawn

=== Television film ===
**Best Drama**
**11 Months 5 Days** **(VTV)** †; **Cherish the Sunny Day - Part 1 -** **(VTV)** †; **When the Apple Tree Blooms** **(HTV)** †; **The Taste of Intimacy** **(VTV)** †; **Former Boss Mother** **(HTV)** †; **Street in the Village** **(VTV)** †; **Criminal Police: Silent Storm** **(VTV)** †; Rebloom (VTV); Let Us Say Love (VTV); Criminal Police: Mirror Mask (VTV); Peaceful Morrow (VTV); Mercy on the Anabas (VTV); The Tree of Tears (HTV)
**Best Director**	**Best Screenplay**
**Bùi Tiến Huy – Cherish the Sunny Day - Part 1 -**	**Street in the Village – Đặng Diệu Hương, Lê Thu Thủy, Nguyễn Trung Dũng**
**Best Leading Actor**	**Best Leading Actress**
**Thanh Sơn – 11 Months 5 Days as Hải Đăng**; Đình Tú – Cherish the Sunny Day - Part 1 - as Hoàng Duy; Hà Việt Dũng – Criminal Police: Silent Storm as Đào Hải Triều	**Khả Ngân – 11 Months 5 Days as Tuệ Nhi**; Thanh Quý – Cherish the Sunny Day - Part 1 - as Mrs. Nga; Ngân Quỳnh – Former Boss Mother as Mrs. Cẩm
**Best Supporting Actor**	**Best Supporting Actress**
**Võ Hoài Nam – The Taste of Intimacy as Mr. Sinh**	**Hương Giang – Rebloom as Tuyết**
**Best Cinematography**
**Vũ Trung Kiên – Let Us Say Love, Criminal Police: Mirror Mask**

==== Multiple wins ====
The following films received multiple wins:

Wins	Films
3	11 Months 5 Days
2	Cherish the Sunny Day - Part 1 -

=== Animated film ===
**Best Film**
**Little Red Bean's Grandma**; **Foggy**; **Mê Linh Heroines**; **Finding the Doctor: Episode 4**; **Mother's Heart**
**Best Director**	**Best Animator**
**Phạm Hồng Sơn – Foggy**	**Nguyễn Thị Hồng Linh – Little Red Bean's Grandma**; **Lê Bình – The Secret of the Garden**

==== Multiple wins ====
The following films received multiple wins:

Wins	Films
2	Little Red Bean's Grandma

=== Documentary film ===
**Best Film**
**Hai bàn tay**; **Không sợ hãi**; **Con đường đã chọn**; **Ngày con chào đời**; **Về đâu những cánh chim trời**; **Bốn mùa trong rừng thẳm**
**Best Director**	**Best Cinematography**
**Đặng Thị Linh – Hai bàn tay**	**Kiều Viết Phong – Ngày con chào đời**

==== Multiple wins ====
The following films received multiple wins:

Wins	Films
2	Hai bàn tay

=== Science film ===
**Best Film**
**Ghép tạng: Biến điều không thể thành có thể**; **Sự cân bằng hoàn hảo của đôi cánh**; **Rác chìm**; **Ngàn năm sênh phách**; **Đất ô nhiễm**
**Best Director**	**Best Cinematography**
**Nguyễn Tài Văn – Sự cân bằng hoàn hảo của đôi cánh**	**Nguyễn Tài Văn, Nguyễn Tài Việt, Nguyễn Đình Hoàn – Sự cân bằng hoàn hảo của đôi cánh**

==== Multiple wins ====
The following films received multiple wins:

Wins	Films
2	Sự cân bằng hoàn hảo của đôi cánh

=== Short film ===
**Best Film**
- **Thành phố thẳng đứng**
- **Người hộ tang**
- **Nỗi đau đẹp nhất**
- **Lên tầng**
- **Nhìn**

=== Film critic/theory research ===
**Best Work**
- **Điện ảnh Việt Nam - Đường ra biển lớn** **(Book) – Trần Việt Văn**
- **Phim ảnh trong Truyền hình Khoa học - Giáo dục** **(Book) – Nguyễn Lê Văn, Đỗ Ngọc Việt Dũng**

== Ceremony ==
=== Presenters ===
The following individuals presented awards at the ceremony:

- MC Hồng Phúc and MC Thụy Vân with Golden Kite for Best Film critic/theory research works
- Singer/actress Minh Hằng and actor Trần Bảo Sơn with Best Works and Individuals - Documentary film & Science film
- Actresses Lan Phương, Lương Thu Trang, Puka and singer/actor Gin Tuấn Kiệt with Best Supporting Actress/Actor - Television & Feature film, Promising Actress
- Actress/singer Trương Quỳnh Anh and her son, actor Hiếu Hiền, actress Mai Thanh Hà with Best Works and Individuals - Animated film & Short film
- Actress Việt Hương and actor Doãn Quốc Đam with Best Screenplay, Best Director and Best Cinematography - Television film
- Actor Quyền Linh and singer Hà Phương with Best Leading Actor/Actress - Television film
- Actor Quyền Linh with Nominees of Golden Kite for Best Television Film
- Actress Trương Ngọc Ánh and actor Minh Luân with Golden Kite for Best Drama
- Models Phan Thị Mơ, Mạnh Lân and Nguyễn Huỳnh Kim Duyên with Best Cinematography, Best Art Design, Best Original Score and Best Sound - Feature film
- Actor Việt Anh and actress Quỳnh Nga with Best Leading Actress/Actor & Best Screenplay - Feature film
- Actor Mạnh Cường and actress Mai Thu Huyền with Best Director - Feature film
- Actress Trà Giang and actor/director Đào Bá Sơn with Golden Kite for Best Feature film

=== Performers ===
The following individuals performed at the ceremony:

- Opening Medley: Singer Thủy Anh with the song Nhớ mùa thu Hà Nội, Đình Văn with the song Thành phố tôi yêu, Hoài Thương with the song Nha Trang mùa thu lại về
- Singer Nhật Kim Anh with the song Simple
- Giang Brothers with a circus performance
- Singer Hà Phương with the song Quen với cô đơn

== See also ==
- 22nd Vietnam Film Festival
- 2021 VTV Awards
