= 2014 VTV Awards =

- Date: September 5, 2014
- Site: S14 Studio, VTV Headquarters, Ngọc Khánh Ward, Ba Đình District, Hanoi
- Hosted by: Nguyên Khang

Television coverage
- Network: VTV3
- Duration: 150 minutes

The 2014 VTV Awards (Vietnamese: Ấn tượng VTV 2014) is a ceremony honouring the outstanding achievement in television on the Vietnam Television (VTV) network from August 2013 to July 2014. It took place on 5 September 2014 in Hanoi and hosted by Nguyên Khang. This is the first ceremony to be held.

== Winners and nominees ==
(Winners denoted in bold)

Impressive New Drama
**Vừa đi vừa khóc** **(Walking Crying)**; Chạm tay vào nỗi nhớ (A Touch to Remember); Chỉ có thể là yêu (It Must be Love); Hoa nở trái mùa (Unseasonal Bloom); Trò đời (Human Comedy)
Impressive MC	Impressive Editor-On-Air
**Công Tố**; Thùy Dương; Trấn Thành; Nguyên Khang; Lại Văn Sâm	**Hoài Anh**; Lê Quang Minh; Tuấn Đức; Ngọc Trinh; Diệp Chi
Impressive Artist	Impressive Stage
**Mỹ Tâm**; Đàm Vĩnh Hưng; Hồ Ngọc Hà; Thanh Bùi; Phương Mỹ Chi	**Gala Như chưa hề có cuộc chia ly** **(As If We Were Never Apart)**; Vietnam Idol; Giọng hát Việt (The Voice of Vietnam); Chào 2014 (Hello 2014); Tôi yêu World Cup (I Love World Cup)
Impressive Humanistic Image	Impressive Topical Image
**Kidney failure patient's wedding: Loan & Vượng** **[in Điều ước thứ 7 (The Saturday Wish)]**; Agricultural engineer Shiokawa Minoru is farming [in the program Hương đất (The Scent of the Soil)]; Ethnic students go to school voluntarily [in the documentary Dưới mái nhà chung (Under the same roof)]; Nối vòng tay lớn - The Great Circle [in the gala Tỏa sáng nghị lực Việt (Shining Vietnam Energy)]; Youngers light candles in front of General Vo's house [in the documentary Chấn động (Concussion)]	**China's ship fires the water cannon towards Vietnam's ship** **(in the 19h News Reports by News Committee)**; Hostilities in Ukraine (in the 19h News Reports by News Committee); Case of the Rig HD-981 (in the 19h News Reports by News Committee); Acrossing the river by plastic bags (by the Television of Youth); The customs officer accepted a bribe (in the 19h News Reports by News Committee)
Impressive Entertainment Program	Impressive Cultural/Social/Scientific/Educational Program
**Bữa trưa vui vẻ** **(Happy Lunch)**; Ảo...thật (How...magical); Giai điệu tự hào (The Proud Melodies); Giọng hát Việt nhí (The Voice Kids Vietnam); Nhân tố bí ẩn (The X Factor Vietnam)	**Cây đàn Điện Biên** **(The Guitar in Điện Biên)**; Biển động (Riptide); Tỏa sáng nghị lực Việt (Shining Vietnamese Energy); Xuôi dòng Đồng Nai (Paddling Down the Đồng Nai River); Điều ước thứ 7 (The Saturday Wish)
Impressive Guest	Netizen's Favourite Program
**Đàm Vĩnh Hưng** [as judge in The X Factor Vietnam]; Hồ Ngọc Hà [as judge in The X Factor Vietnam]; Mỹ Tâm [as judge in Vietnam Idol]; Mr. Đặng Thiêm [as player in Ai là triệu phú (Who Wants to be a Millionaire? Vietnam)]; Xuân Bắc [as MC in Đồ Rê Mí]	**5S Online**; Chinh phục (Vietnam's Brainiest Kid); Ghế không tựa (The Stool); Ai là triệu phú (Who Wants to Be a Millionaire? Vietnam); Tiệm bánh hoàng tử bé (Little Prince Bakery)

== Presenters ==
Order	Presenter	Award
1	Kim Tiến, Phan Anh	Impressive MC
2	Diệp Anh, Vũ Mạnh Cường	Impressive Editor-On-Air
3	Chu Lai, Ái Phương	Impressive Topical Image
4	Trương Ngọc Ánh, Hoàng Dũng	Impressive Artist
5	Xuân Bắc, Đinh Tiến Dũng	Impressive Guest
6	Phú Quang, Đặng Châu Anh	Impressive Humanistic Image
7	Minh Thư, Việt Tú	Impressive Stage
8	Uyên Linh, Bùi Thạc Chuyên	Impressive New Drama
9	Đoàn Xuân Hợp	Netizen's Favourite Program
10	Hồ Trung Dũng, Tạ Bích Loan	Impressive Cultural/Social/Scientific/Educational Program
11	Ốc Thanh Vân, Trương Nam Thành	Impressive Entertainment Program

== Special performances ==
Order	Artist	Performed
1	Đinh Mạnh Ninh, Dương Hoàng Yến, Mr. T	"Cuộc sống muôn màu"
2	Oplus & FB Boiz	"I Wanna Be A Star"
3	Đinh Mạnh Ninh & Cao Thanh Thảo My	"Giấc mơ tình yêu"
4	Tùng Dương	"Độc đạo"
5	Mai Quốc Việt	Medley of famous songs
6	Tạ Quang Thắng & Đồ Rê Mí contestants	"Sống như những đóa hoa"
7	Vũ Cát Tường	"Cất bước"
8	Nhật Thủy	"Phía cuối chân trời"
9	Ái Phương	"Em muốn" (Trái tim có nắng OST)
10	Minh Quân	"Niềm tin khát khao"
11	Minh Thư	"Nắng" (Vừa đi vừa khóc OST)
12	Uyên Linh	"Ngày nắng"
13	Dương Hoàng Yến	"Đừng buồn phiền"
14	FB Boiz	"Tên tôi Việt Nam"
