= Cặp Lá Yêu Thương =

- Genre: Mentality; Emotional
- Country of origin: Vietnam
- Original language: Vietnamese

Original release
- Network: VTV1

Cặp Lá Yêu Thương is a television program produced by Vietnam Television. On the evening of October 4, 2015, at Studio S14, Vietnam Television, the Ministry of Labor - Invalids and Social Affairs collaborated with the Social Policy Bank and VTV24 News Center to organize the Launching Ceremony and Signing of Cooperation for the Program.

== Awards ==
Year	Award	Category	Nominee	Result	Reference
2016	VTV Awards	Impressive cultural - social - scientific - educational program	The Beloved Leaves Duo	Won	
