= Việc tử tế =

- Genre: Mentality; Emotional
- Country of origin: Vietnam
- Original language: Vietnamese

Original release
- Network: VTV1
- Release: 2015 – present

Việc Tử Tế is a television program produced by Vietnam Television. Launched in 2015, the program "Acts of Kindness" is accompanied by Truong Hai Group Corporation.

== Awards ==
Year	Award	Category	Nominees	Result	Reference
2022	VTV Awards	Impressive Cultural – Sports Program	* Acts of Kindness – For the Nation Needs Hearts: Beautiful Youth: Stories of Autumn; Overcoming Limits: Nguyen Linh Na	Won	
