= Forever Young (2014 TV series) =

- Genre: Drama; Romance
- Directed by: Nguyễn Khải Anh; Bùi Tiến Huy; Myung Hyun-woo
- Starring: Nhã Phương; Kang Tae-oh
- Theme music composer: Xuân Phương
- Opening theme: "Tuổi thanh xuân" "Cứ thế"
- Ending theme: "Cứ thế" "Đến bên em"
- Countries of origin: Vietnam; South Korea
- Original languages: Vietnamese; Korean
- No. of seasons: 2
- No. of episodes: 74

Production
- Executive producers: Đỗ Thanh Hải; Lee Chan-ho
- Production locations: Hanoi, Vietnam; Seoul, South Korea; Da Nang, Vietnam; Hội An, Vietnam; Hạ Long, Vietnam; New York, United States
- Cinematography: Vũ Trung Kiên
- Editor: Diệu Hương
- Running time: 45 minutes/episode
- Production company: VFC

Original release
- Network: VTV3
- Release: 17 December 2014 – 22 March 2017
- Network: MBC
- Release: 23 June – 30 July 2015

Forever Young (Korean: 오늘도 청춘, Vietnamese: Tuổi thanh xuân) is a Vietnamese-South Korean TV series produced by Vietnam Television in cooperation with CJ E&M Pictures by Nguyen Khai Anh, Bui Tien Huy and Myung Hyun Woo as directors.

The film consists of two parts: Part 1 has 36 episodes and Part 2 has 38 episodes.

== Plot ==
=== Part 1 ===
Thùy Linh – a beautiful, innocent girl pampered by her parents - has realized her dream of coming to Korea to study and satisfy her passion for K-pop and Korean culture. Linh entered an independent life in South Korea with a scholarship at a university in Seoul. Incidentally sharing the inn with Khanh, Mai and Lee Jun-su – the son of the beautiful but rebellious hostess, Linh has had many difficulties when Jun-su is the popular idol who always troubles her. Many people with different personalities and preferences living under one roof would not be reconciled. Still, all four of them and their other friends overcame all disagreements and had a good time, so none of them would not regret their youth in their future.

In Seoul, South Korea, Linh and Jun-su gradually develop feelings for each other, and after that, they fall in love. Junsu does not realize Miso's feelings. Meanwhile, Linh did not know that Khanh was liking her. An incident occurred that caused Linh's family to go bankrupt, her home was lost, her mother was in a coma because of a brain hemorrhage, so Linh had to go back to Vietnam urgently without meeting again. Junsu was shocked but couldn't do anything because he decided to pursue his career.

=== Part 2 ===
Linh brought Junsu back to debut with her parents. At first, they were furious and opposed; however, after that, they became sympathetic towards Junsu. Turns out again when Junsu has a traffic accident and loses his memory. He is forced to go to the United States for surgery and meets Cynthia when intending to commit suicide on the rooftop of a Brooklyn bar after losing a bar fight and his memory. Referred to as Jace by Cynthia, the two begin to date each other in the pain and helplessness of Linh. She is forced to stop with Junsu because his family wants him to live well with a new identity in the present.

Linh becomes the strategy leader for a resort company, and she is transferred to Da Nang. There, she happens to meet Junsu again after 4 years and Cynthia — Junsu's previous fiancée. His indifferent attitude towards Linh made her fall into despair. Besides the love story, Linh also has trouble in her relationship with director Phong. Phong gradually falls in love with Linh, while Cynthia learns of the love story between Linh and Junsu through Khanh's story and considers Linh as her love rival. The romantic relationships become gradually dramatic, complicated and meet multiple obstacles and challenges throughout the drama's second half.

== Cast ==
=== Main characters ===
- Nhã Phương as Thùy Linh: Being the only child in a well-off family, Linh was adored by her parents. She loves Korean culture and especially the music of this country. Linh wins a scholarship to study in South Korea and moves to live with Jun-su's family. She is cheerful, optimistic, and innocent. She gradually falls in love with Jun-su and always cares for him, even after Jun-su is injured and loses his memory of her. In part 2, Linh is a strategy leader in a resort corporation in Da Nang and gets into conflicts with Cynthia, who considers Linh a love rival.
- Kang Tae-oh as Lee Jun-su / Jace: is the son of the innkeeper. He has an attractive appearance with dancing skills and a good voice. He is also an idol trainee at the most popular KM entertainment company in Korea. Junsu is competitive, arrogant, and playful while occasionally being sweet and lovesick at the same time. His life has been turned upside down since the first moment Thuy Linh appeared in his life. They later fall in love with each other. In part 2, Jun-su is hit by a truck when crossing the road and loses a part of his memory. He goes to the United States to treat his brain injury and meets Cynthia in a fight at a New York bar, referred to as Jace by Cynthia. He also stops his idol career and becomes an architect for a resort company in Da Nang.
- Hồng Đăng as Khánh: He is an elite student coming to Korea to study for a Master's degree with a Government scholarship. However, Khanh's goal is to find information about his Korean father. Khanh met Linh for the first time with lots of troubles. He did not expect his fate and Linh's fate to be associated with each other since then.
- Jung Hae-na as Cynthia: The person Junsu fell in love with in America after losing his memory. She is a formidable opponent to Linh for Junsu's feelings, more than Miso was. Filled with hatred for Linh for "stealing" the love of her life, she often plots to ruin Linh and Junsu's relationship and cause trouble for Linh. Later in the series, she is revealed to be using sedatives to treat her depression and even threatens to commit suicide in front of Junsu and Linh. At the end of the series, she accepts to give up Jun-su.
- Mạnh Trường as Phong: Phong is Linh's director at a resort in Danang. Although he has crazy feelings for Linh, but instead, Linh only considers him a colleague.

=== Supporting characters ===
- Kim Tuyến as Mai: is a teacher at an international high school in Korea. Mai helped Linh from their very first days in Korea and is someone she can share a lot about both emotions and life. Since then, she and Jiyong have also become husband and wife
- Shin Jae-ha as Ji-yong: is a rebellious high school student who acts against his teacher. Jiyong has caused Mai a headache many times, but due to Mai's tenderness and sincerity, his pupil Jiyong has gradually turned into a touch.
- Shin Hye-sun as Han Mi-so: She is an intelligent and unrequited girl with Junsu during their time on campus. However, she never dared to express her feelings and for Junsu, Miso is always just a close friend.
- Lee Kyu-bok as Sung-jae: He is best friends with Junsu and Miso, the three being a group. Sungjae lives an optimistic and happy life, but many times, he makes Junsu and Miso crazy
- Noh Haeng-ha as Jun-hee Junhee is Junsu's younger sister, goes to the same school and has a special love for Jiyong. She is also friendly with Linh and Cynthia.
- Son Jong-hak Jun-su's father
- Lee Ah-hyun as Jun-su's mother
- Trọng Trinh as Linh's father: He is a father who cares about his family.
- Minh Hòa as Linh's mother: She is a mother who cares about her family but is also very strict with Linh.

== Rating ==
=== Part 2 ===
date	ep.	Hanoi	Ho Chi Minh City
03/11/2016	1	31.76	2.81
09/11/2016	2	N/A	N/A
10/11/2016	3	23.90	(<2.09)
16/11/2016	4	20.27	(<2.55)
17/11/2016	5	22.45	2.57
23/11/2016	6	16.57	(<3.02)
24/11/2016	7	30.61	(<2.87)
30/11/2016	8	19.63	2.95
01/12/2016	9	29.78	(<2.59)
02/12/2016	10	14.00	(<2.17)
07/12/2016	11	28.31	(<3.46)
14/12/2016	12	16.88	(<3.09)
15/12/2016	13	26.50	(<3.15)
21/12/2016	14	24.17	(<2.94)
22/12/2016	15	28.35	6.53
28/12/2016	16	30.10	(<3.14)
29/12/2016	17	30.61	3.54
04/01/2017	18	25.36	(<2.82)
05/01/2017	19	38.10	(<2.52)
11/01/2017	20	31.62	(<2.87)
12/01/2017	21	38.75	3.18
18/01/2017	22	34.26	(<2.94)
19/01/2017	23	36.37	(<3.07)
25/01/2017	24	26.65	(<3.11)
26/01/2017	25	40.77	4.31
08/02/2017	26	31.45	(<3.61)
09/02/2017	27	35.19	(<2.90)
15/02/2017	28	31.21	(<2.92)
16/02/2017	29	37.43	4.00
22/02/2017	30	29.20	(<3.16)
23/02/2017	31	36.91	4.44
01/03/2017	32	29.50	(<3.73)
02/03/2017	33	38.11	(<3.20)
08/03/2017	34	39.46	(<3.00)
09/03/2017	35	38.34	3.83
15/03/2017	36	28.63	(<3.54)
16/03/2017	37	37.13	(<3.13)
22/03/2017	38	31.06	(<4.05)

== Prize ==
Awards and nominations
Year	Prize	Categories	Nominee(s)	Result	References
2015	VTV Awards	Most Impressive Actor	Kang Tae-oh	Won	
2015	VTV Awards	Most Impressive Actress	Nhã Phương	Won	
2015	VTV Awards	Most Impressive TV Series	Forever Young	Won	
2016	Cánh diều vàng	Best TV Series	Forever Young	Won	
2016	Cánh diều vàng	Best Actress in a TV series	Nhã Phương	Won	
2016	Cánh diều vàng	Best Supporting Actress in a TV series	Kim Tuyến	Won	
2017	VTV Awards	Most Impressive Drama	Forever Young 2	Nominated	
2017	VTV Awards	Most Impressive Actress	Nhã Phương	Nominated	
2017	VTV Awards	Most Impressive Actor	Kang Tae-oh	Nominated	
