= 2017 VTV Awards =

- Date: September 7, 2017
- Site: Studio S14, VTV Headquarters, Ngọc Khánh Ward, Ba Đình District, Hanoi
- Hosted by: Lại Văn Sâm, Thanh Vân Hugo

Television coverage
- Network: VTV1
- Duration: 140 minutes

The 2017 VTV Awards (Vietnamese: Ấn tượng VTV - Điểm hẹn 2017) is a ceremony honouring the outstanding achievement in television on the Vietnam Television (VTV) network from August 2016 to July 2017. It took place on September 7, 2017 in Hanoi and hosted by Lại Văn Sâm & Thanh Vân Hugo.

== Winners and nominees ==
(Winners denoted in bold)

Impressive Drama
**Người phán xử** **(The Arbitrator)**; Tuổi thanh xuân 2 (Forever Young 2); Sống chung với mẹ chồng (Living with Mother-in-Law); Mátxcơva - Mùa thay lá (Moscow in Season of Falling Leaves); Ngự lâm không kiếm (Musketeer Without Sword)
Impressive Actor	Impressive Actress
**Hoàng Dũng** - **Người phán xử** **(The Arbitrator)**; Kang Tae-oh - Tuổi thanh xuân 2 (Forever Young 2); Bảo Anh - Người phán xử (The Arbitrator); Hồng Đăng - Người phán xử (The Arbitrator), Mátxcơva - Mùa thay lá (Moscow in Season of Falling Leaves); Trung Anh - Người phán xử (The Arbitrator)	**Bảo Thanh** - **Sống chung với mẹ chồng** **(Living with Mother-in-Law)**, **Hợp đồng hôn nhân** **(Marriage Contract)**; Nhã Phương - Tuổi thanh xuân 2 (Forever Young 2); Thanh Hương - Người phán xử (The Arbitrator); Hồng Diễm - Mátxcơva - Mùa thay lá (Moscow in Season of Falling Leaves); Kim Oanh - Chiều ngang qua phố cũ (Twilight On The Old Town)
Impressive TV Presenter	Impressive Singer
**Thành Trung**; Phí Nguyễn Thùy Linh; Thụy Vân; Trấn Thành; Xuân Bắc	**Vũ Cát Tường**; Sơn Tùng M-TP; Noo Phước Thịnh; S.T Sơn Thạch; Đen Vâu
Impressive Comedian	Impressive Cultural/Social Science/Educational Program
**Xuân Bắc**; Công Lý; Trường Giang; Trấn Thành; Hoài Linh	**VTV Đặc biệt: Giấc mơ bay** **(VTV Special: Flying Dream)**; Lớp học cầu vồng (The Rainbow Class); Gương mặt thương hiệu (The Face Vietnam); Trường Teen (Teen School); Biệt tài tí hon (Tiny Talent)
Impressive Topical Image	Impressive Musical Program
**The epic in Gạc Ma island** **(by News Committee)**; The increase of child abuse, the decrease of societal morality (by VTV Cần Thơ); Worries of families during the case of child abuse (by News Committee); Unfair tricks in the gasoline market (by VTV24 Center); Suffusion of fake beef made from pork (by VTV24 Center)	**Bài hát hay nhất** **(Sing My Song Vietnam)**; Hòa âm Ánh sáng (The Remix Vietnam); Đón Tết cùng VTV 2017 (Welcoming Tet with VTV 2017); Gala Giai điệu tự hào 2016 (The Proud Melodies - 2016 Gala); Giai điệu tự hào tháng 9/2016 (The Proud Melodies, Issue September 2016)
Figure of the Year	Program of the Year
**44 male teachers of Tri Lễ 4 primary school, Nghệ An** [in Thay lời tri ân 2016 (As the Words of Gratitude 2016)]; Hoàng Xuân Vinh; Lê Công Vinh; Hồ Đắc Thanh Chương [in Đường lên đỉnh Olympia (Way to Olympia Peak)]; Phan Đăng Nhật Minh [in Đường lên đỉnh Olympia (Way to Olympia Peak)]	**Gặp nhau cuối năm - Táo Quân xuân Đinh Dậu** **(Kitchen Gods 2017)**; VTV Đặc biệt: Đêm trắng (VTV Special: White Night); Gala Cặp lá yêu thương: Những đứa con của hòa bình (Loving Leaves Gala: Children of Peace); VTV Đặc biệt: Hai đứa trẻ (VTV Special: Two Children); VTV Đặc biệt: Sống trong lòng đất (VTV Special: Living Beneath the Ground)
Jury's Impressive Figure of the Year
**Nguyễn Thị Ánh Viên**

== Presenters/Awarders ==
Several winners was announced by the hosts Lại Văn Sâm & Thanh Vân Hugo, then the awarder only appeared to give the prize.

Order	Presenter/Awarder	Award
1	Thanh Lam, Hồ Quang Lợi	Impressive TV Presenter
2	Nguyễn Thanh Lâm	Impressive Topical Image
3	Thanh Bạch, Đỗ Mỹ Linh	Impressive Comedian
4	Mỹ Tâm, Lại Văn Sâm	Impressive Musical Program
5	Đỗ Hồng Quân	Impressive Singer
6	Nguyễn Thị Thu Hiền	Impressive Cultural/Social Science/Educational Program
7	Nguyễn Khải Hưng, Trần Uyên Phương	Impressive Drama
8	Jordan Vogt-Roberts	Impressive Actress
9	Vương Duy Biên	Impressive Actor
10	Hoàng Vĩnh Bảo	Figure of the Year
11	Nguyễn Thành Lương	Program of the Year
12	Trần Bình Minh	Jury's Impressive Figure of the Year

== Special performances ==
Order	Artist	Performed
1	Monstar	"Và tôi hát"
2	Hoàng Dũng, Lan Hương, Bảo Thanh, Công Lý, Minh Hà, Mai Ngọc & VTV Crew (with Đen Vâu)	"Ông bà anh" VTV parody
3	Yến Lê & Yanbi	"Cò lả" (from Hòa âm Ánh sáng)
4	Bích Phương	"Bao giờ lấy chồng"
5	Mỹ Tâm (with piano by Khắc Hưng)	"Đâu chỉ riêng em"
6	MTV	"Cám ơn ngày mới" (from Bài hát hay nhất)
7	Oplus	"Cứ thế" (Tuổi thanh xuân 2 OST)
8	Thanh Lam	"Tôi hỏi cây tần bì" (Mátxcơva - Mùa thay lá OST)
9	Khánh Linh	"Hạnh phúc mong manh" (Sống chung với mẹ chồng OST)
10	P336	"Đừng ngại ngùng (Don't be shy)"
11	Hoàng Hồng Ngọc, Hồng Duyên, Sèn Hoàng Mỹ Lam, Nguyễn Trần Trung Quân, Hà Minh Tiến	"Chào cuộc sống"
