= Doctor Detective =

2019 South Korean television series

- Promotional poster
- Also known as: Dr. Detective
- Hangul: 닥터 탐정
- RR: Dakteo tamjeong
- MR: Takt'ŏ t'amjŏng
- Genre: Drama
- Created by: Park Young-soo (SBS Drama Division)
- Written by: Song Yoon-hee
- Directed by: Park Joon-woo
- Starring: Park Jin-hee; Bong Tae-gyu; Lee Ki-woo
- Music by: Kim Seung-yeol
- Country of origin: South Korea
- Original language: Korean
- No. of episodes: 16

Production
- Camera setup: Single-camera
- Running time: 70 minutes
- Production company: The Story Works

Original release
- Network: SBS TV
- Release: July 17 – September 5, 2019

Doctor Detective (Korean: 닥터 탐정; RR: Dakteo tamjeong) is a 2019 South Korean television series starring Park Jin-hee, Bong Tae-gyu and Lee Ki-woo. It aired from July 17 to September 5, 2019 on SBS.

== Synopsis ==
The story of doctors who try to uncover the truth behind industrial accidents. It also factors in real life occupational hazard events that happened to real South Korean citizens by tailoring the drama to the real life event.

== Cast ==
=== Main ===
- Park Jin-hee as Do Joong-eun
- Bong Tae-gyu as Heo Min-ki
- Lee Ki-woo as Choi Tae-yeong

=== Supporting ===
==== Undiagnosed Disease Center ====
- Park Ji-young as Gong Il-soon
- Lee Young-jin as Byeon Jeong-ho
- Mina Fujii as Seok Jin-i
- Jung Kang-hee as Ha Jin-hak
- Lee Yeong-seok as Mr. Go

==== TL Medical Center ====
- Ryu Hyun-kyung as Choi Min
- Lee Chul-min as Mr. Kwon
- Choi Kwang-il as Mo Seong-gook

==== Others ====
- Park Joo-hyung as Im Gook-sin
- Jung Soon-won as Team leader Jeong
- Kwon Hyuk-bum as Kim Do-hyeong
- Bae Noo-ri as Park Hye-mi
- Moon Tae-yu as Kwon Jun-il
- Kim Min-ho as Kwon Do-yoon
- Chae Yoo-ri as Choi Seo-rin
- Park Geun-hyung as Choi Gon
- Shin Dam-soo as Mr. Go
- Lee Yoon-sang as President
- Cha Soon-bae as General manager
- Noh Haeng-ha as Kim Yang-hee
- Park Sung-joon

=== Special appearances ===
- Kwak Dong-yeon as Jeong Ha-rang
- Hwang Jung-min as Ha-rang's mother
- Oh Dong-min as Bakery president
- Jang Won-hyung
- Yoon So-yi as Yoon Si-wol

== Original soundtrack ==
Doctor Detective OST

Soundtrack album by Various artists
- Released: 2019
- Genre: Soundtrack
- Languages: Korean; English
- Labels: Blending Co., Ltd. SBS Content Hub

=== Part 1 ===
Released on August 22, 2019
No.	Title	Artist	Length
1.	"Cheonggyecheon 8ga" (청계천 8가)	Lee Jung-ah	4:33
2.	"Cheonggyecheon 8ga" (Inst.)		4:33
Total length:			9:06

=== Part 2 ===
Released on August 22, 2019
No.	Title	Artist	Length
1.	"Dangerous World" (위험한 세계)	Chae Wool	5:07
2.	"Dangerous World" (Inst.)		5:07
Total length:			10:14

=== Part 3 ===
Released on August 28, 2019
No.	Title	Artist	Length
1.	"What Is" (무엇이 되어)	Yoo Yi-ran	3:53
2.	"What Is" (Inst.)		3:53
Total length:			7:46

== Ratings ==
- In this table, the blue numbers represent the lowest ratings and the red numbers represent the highest ratings.
- Each night's broadcast is divided into two 30-minute parts with a commercial break in between.

Ep.	Original broadcast date	Nationwide (AGB Nielsen)
1	July 17, 2019	4.6%
1	July 17, 2019	5.7%
2	July 18, 2019	5.1%
2	July 18, 2019	5.2%
3	July 24, 2019	4.6%
3	July 24, 2019	5.0%
4	July 25, 2019	5.0%
4	July 25, 2019	5.1%
5	July 31, 2019	3.7%
5	July 31, 2019	4.3%
6	August 1, 2019	4.3%
6	August 1, 2019	3.8%
7	August 7, 2019	4.4%
7	August 7, 2019	4.8%
8	August 8, 2019	4.0%
8	August 8, 2019	4.0%
9	August 14, 2019	4.0%
9	August 14, 2019	4.4%
10	August 15, 2019	4.4%
10	August 15, 2019	4.1%
11	August 21, 2019	3.5%
11	August 21, 2019	4.0%
12	August 22, 2019	3.1%
12	August 22, 2019	3.5%
13	August 28, 2019	2.5%
13	August 28, 2019	3.1%
14	August 29, 2019	2.8%
14	August 29, 2019	2.8%
15	September 4, 2019	3.0%
15	September 4, 2019	3.4%
16	September 5, 2019	3.9%
16	September 5, 2019	3.9%
Average		4.1%
