= 2016 VTV Awards =

- Date: September 7, 2016
- Site: Hòa Bình Theater, Ward 12, District 10, Ho Chi Minh City
- Hosted by: Trấn Thành, Ái Phương (Leading); Quốc Minh, Tuyền Tăng (Red Carpet)

Television coverage
- Network: VTV1
- Duration: 160 minutes

The 2016 VTV Awards (Vietnamese: Ấn tượng VTV - Chuyển động 2016) is a ceremony honouring the outstanding achievement in television on the Vietnam Television (VTV) network from August 2015 to July 2016. It took place on September 7, 2016 in Ho Chi Minh City and hosted by Trấn Thành & Ái Phương.

== Winners and nominees ==
(Winners denoted in bold)

Impressive Drama
**Zippo, mù tạt và em** **(Zippo, Mustard and You)**; Khúc hát mặt trời (A Song to the Sun); Bạch mã hoàng tử (Prince Charming); Những ngọn nến trong đêm 2 (Candles in the Night 2); Nguyệt thực (Eclipse)
Impressive Actor	Impressive Actress
**Hồng Đăng** - **Zippo, mù tạt và em** **(Zippo, Mustard and You)**; Chí Nhân - Hôn nhân trong ngõ hẹp (Marriage in the Narrow Alley), Cảnh sát hình sự: Câu hỏi số 5 (Criminal Police: Question Number 5), Lựa chọn cuối cùng (The Last Choice); Việt Anh - Khi đàn chim trở về 3 (When the Birds Returns 3); Mạnh Trường - Người đứng trong gió (The Man Who Stands in the Wind), Zippo, mù tạt và em (Zippo, Mustard and You); Bình Minh - Những ngọn nến trong đêm 2 (Candles in the Night 2)	**Nhã Phương** - **Khúc hát mặt trời** **(A Song to the Sun)**, **Zippo, mù tạt và em** **(Zippo, Mustard and You)**; Diễm Hương - Hôn nhân trong ngõ hẹp (Marriage in the Narrow Alley); Ninh Dương Lan Ngọc - Nguyệt thực (Eclipse); Cao Thái Hà - Đồng tiền quỷ ám (Evil Money); Mai Thu Huyền - Những ngọn nến trong đêm 2 (Candles in the Night 2)
Impressive TV Presenter	Impressive Singer
**Ngọc Trinh**; Trấn Thành; Trường Giang; Đại Nghĩa; Việt Hương	**Hồ Văn Cường**; Noo Phước Thịnh; Sơn Tùng M-TP; Mỹ Tâm; Khởi My
Impressive Comedian	Impressive Cultural/Social/Scientific/Educational Program
**Trường Giang**; Thu Trang; Trấn Thành; Hoài Linh; Việt Hương	**Cặp lá yêu thương** **(Loving Leaves)**; Giờ gia đình: Mẹ tôi (Family Time: My Mother); Đường về nhà (Way Back Home); 8 IELTS (IELTS Chat); Khám phá khoa học (Discovery of Science)
Impressive Topical Image	Impressive Musical Program
**Last meeting of the cancer mother with her son** **[in the news program Cuộc sống thường ngày (Daily Life)]**; Syrian Children [in VTV Đặc biệt: Hành trình của sự sống và cái chết (VTV Special: Journey of Life and Death)]; The tricks in selling gasoline [in 24h Moving by VTV24 News Center]; Parade to celebrate 70 years of National Day; Candidates wait to withdraw and submit applications for 2015 college admissions [in the news program Good Morning]	**Chào 2016** **(Hello 2016)**; Giai điệu tự hào: Thời thanh niên sôi nổi (The Proud Melodies: Enthusiastic Youth); Thần tượng Bolero (Nation's Best Voice Vietnam); Muôn màu showbiz (Colorful Showbiz); Giai điệu tự hào: Những trang viết còn lại (The Proud Melodies: Remaining Writing Pages)
Figure of the Year	Program of the Year
**Trần Lập**; Trần Khánh Vy [from 8 IELTS (IELTS Chat)]; Đặng Xuân Chinh [from Điều ước thứ 7 (The Saturday Wish)]; Nguyễn Thảo Vân [from VTV Đặc biệt: Tôi đẹp, bạn cũng thế! (VTV Special: I am beautiful and you too)]; Lê Nguyễn Khánh Linh [from Điều ước thứ 7 (The Saturday Wish)]	**Gặp nhau cuối năm 2016** **(Kitchen Gods 2016)**; VTV Đặc biệt: Trường học vui vẻ (VTV Special: Happy School); VTV Đặc biệt: Tôi đẹp, bạn cũng thế! (VTV Special: I am beautiful and you too); Tạp chí kinh tế thế giới: Thế giới phẳng hay không phẳng (World Economic Journal: Is The World Flat Or Not?); Điều ước thứ 7, Issue #73

== Presenters ==
Order	Presenter	Award
1	Bình Minh, Hồng Ánh	Impressive TV Presenter
2	Thu Minh, Lê Quang Minh	Impressive Topical Image
3	Đại Nghĩa, Tóc Tiên	Impressive Comedian
4	Nhã Phương, Kang Tae-oh	Impressive Cultural/Social/Scientific/Educational Program
5	Đỗ Thanh Hải & Lâm Thanh Mỹ, Trọng Khang, Thịnh Vinh (Yellow Flowers on the Green Grass young cast)	Impressive Actor
5	Đỗ Thanh Hải & Lâm Thanh Mỹ, Trọng Khang, Thịnh Vinh (Yellow Flowers on the Green Grass young cast)	Impressive Actress
6	Noo Phước Thịnh, Việt Hương	Impressive Drama
7	Nguyễn Quang Dũng, Phi Nhung	Impressive Singer
7	Nguyễn Quang Dũng, Phi Nhung	Impressive Musical Program
8	Đinh La Thăng, Thụy Vân, Hoàng Xuân Vinh	Figure of the Year
9	Trần Bình Minh, Thùy Dương	Program of the Year

== Special performances ==
Order	Artist	Performed
1	Thụy Vân, Mai Ngân, Minh Hà, Thùy Dương, Ngân Hà, Trần Quang Minh, Anh Quân, Anh Hải, Hồng Phúc (9 MC representing 9 VTV channels)	"I Dreamed a Dream" (VTV Ver.)
2	Bảo Kun & DJ Hưng	"Rap VTV"
3	MTV & Oplus	"Tôi yêu"
4	Khương Ngọc & Hòa Minzy	"Vì tôi còn sống" parody
5	Thu Minh & Gia Kiệt, Bảo Trân, Jaden (from top 4 Vietnam Idol Kids)	"Tình ca"
6	Trần Quang Thủy & PB Nation	Mash-up "Về bản cùng em" & "Chợ tình"
7	Phạm Anh Khoa	"Lối cũ ta về", "Mùa thu", "Trở về" (In Memoriam performance)
8	Vũ Thảo My	"Don't Be A Heartbreaker"
9	Trọng Hiếu	"Bước đến bên em"
10	SAM Academy & ABC KIDS	"Tomorrow"
11	Vũ Cát Tường	"Góc đa hình"
12	Trúc Nhân	"Vẽ"
13	Ái Phương, Dương Hoàng Yến, Trang Pháp, Vũ Thảo My, Diệp Lâm Anh, Thái Trinh, Thiều Bảo Trang, Tiêu Châu Như Quỳnh, Nguyễn Cao Bảo Uyên	"Can't Take My Eyes Off You"

== In Memoriam ==
- Thanh Tùng - Composer
- Châu Huế - Director
- Thúy Lan - Singer
- Hán Văn Tình - Actor, Comedian
- Lương Minh - Composer
- Vũ Quốc Hương - Cinematographer
- Trần Lập - Rocker, Songwriter
