= Noh Haeng-ha =

South Korean actress (born 1990)

- Born: 10 April 1990 (age 36); Hampyeong County, South Jeolla Province, South Korea
- Other names: Roh Haeng-ha, No Hae-joo, No Haeng-ha, No Hang-ha, Noh Haeng-ha, 노행하
- Education: Dongguk University (Bachelor of Arts)
- Occupation: Actress
- Years active: 2008–present
- Agent: C-JeS Studios
- Known for: Forever Young; Nokdu Flower; Joseon Attorney

Korean name
- Hangul: 노행하
- RR: No Haengha
- MR: No Haengha

Noh Haeng-ha (Korean: 노행하; born 10 April 1990) is a South Korean actress. She is known for her roles in dramas such as Forever Young, Through the Waves, Nokdu Flower, Doctor Detective and Joseon Attorney.

== Filmography ==
=== Television series ===
Year	Title	Role	Ref.
2009	Assorted Gems	Hye-jeong	
2009	High Kick Through the Roof	Student	
2014	KBS Drama Special: "S.O.S Please Help Me"	Kim Da-yeong	
2014	Forever Young	Lee Jun-hee	
2016	W	Kim Yoo-ri	
2016	Always Springtime	Goo Ji-yoon	
2016	Forever Young 2	Lee Jun-hee	
2017	Circle	Sister Kim	
2018	Through the Waves	Hwang Mi-jin	
2019	Nokdu Flower	Beo Deul	
2019	Doctor Detective	Kim Yang-hee	
2021	Sisyphus: The Myth	Park Mi-jung	
2021	Joseon Exorcist	Yeon-ha	
2023	Joseon Attorney	Myung-wol	
2023	The First Responders 2	Park Yong-soo's wife	

=== Film ===
Year	Title	Role	Ref.
2008	Death Bell	Kim Min-jin	
2015	Empire of Lust	Chun Hyang-ru	
2021	I Will, Song	So-won	

=== Music video appearances ===
Year	Title	Artist	Length	Ref.
2014	The One Who Loves More Hurts	Pro C	3:00	
2014	The Heart Said	SoReal	3:50	
2015	6 Am	MFBTY	4:00	
