= 2021 VTV Awards =

Vietnamese television awards ceremony

- Date: January 1, 2022
- Site: Studio S14, VTV Headquarters, Ngọc Khánh Ward, Ba Đình District, Hanoi
- Hosted by: Phí Linh, Tuấn Dương, Hồng Nhung, Việt Hoàng, Quốc Khánh

Television coverage
- Network: VTV1
- Duration: 165 minutes

The 2021 VTV Awards (Vietnamese: Ấn tượng VTV 2021 - Hành trình nhiệm màu) is a ceremony honouring the outstanding achievement in television on the Vietnam Television (VTV) network from August 2020 to July 2021. It was planned to take place on September 5, 2021 but delayed due to the impact of COVID-19 quarantine. On December 3, it was announced that the ceremony will take place on January 1, 2022 merging with New Year welcoming show.

This year, audience can only vote in Round 2 (Top 5). For the first time, audience votes are collected from views, heart-dropping and shares on the VTVGo mobile app.

== Winners and nominees ==
(Winners denoted in bold)

Impressive Drama
**Hương vị tình thân (The Taste of Intimacy)**; Hướng dương ngược nắng (Extraordinary Sunflowers); Mùa hoa tìm lại (Rebloom); Thương con cá rô đồng (Mercy on the Anabas); Yêu hơn cả bầu trời (Sky-high Love)
Impressive Actor	Impressive Actress
**Mạnh Trường - Hương vị tình thân (The Taste of Intimacy),** **Cảnh sát hình sự: Hồ sơ cá sấu (Criminal Police: The Crocodile File)**; Việt Anh - Hướng dương ngược nắng (Extraordinary Sunflowers), Cảnh sát hình sự: Hồ sơ cá sấu (Criminal Police: The Crocodile File); Hồng Đăng - Hướng dương ngược nắng (Extraordinary Sunflowers); Thanh Sơn - Yêu hơn cả bầu trời (Sky-high Love); Công Dương - Hãy nói lời yêu (Let Us Say Love)	**Hồng Diễm - Hướng dương ngược nắng** **(Extraordinary Sunflowers)**; Lương Thu Trang - Hướng dương ngược nắng (Extraordinary Sunflowers); Thu Hà - Hướng dương ngược nắng (Extraordinary Sunflowers); Thúy Diễm - Cát đỏ (Red Sand); Tú Oanh - Hương vị tình thân (The Taste of Intimacy)
Impressive TV Presenter	Impressive Artist
**Tuấn Dương**; Phí Linh; Quốc Khánh; Việt Hoàng; Hồng Nhung	**Xuân Bắc**; H'Hen Niê; Đen Vâu; Erik; Quang Đăng
Impressive Topical Image	Impressive Children's Program
**The horrified landslide at Trà Leng**; The hand-waving of care; Trường Sa Islands in the day of all-people election; The mark of 80 days changed lives of the Nhi twins; Forest under water	**Thiếu niên nói (Teens Speak)**; Alo English; Đêm thu cổ tích 2020 (Fairy Autumn Night 2020); Hòa ca nhí (Let's Harmonize! Kids); Trạng nguyên nhí (Little Trạng-nguyên)
Impressive Culture/Sport Program	Impressive Entertainment Program
**Tổ quốc trong tim (Homeland in the Heart)**; Du xuân 2021: Xe đạp ơi! (Spring Travel 2021: Hey Bikey!); Con đường âm nhạc (The Music Path); Điều ước thứ 7: Chàng chăn bò Sô Y Tiết (The Saturday Wish: Soytiet the Herdsman); Rap UEFA Euro - Issue on June 20, 2021	**Cuộc hẹn cuối tuần (The Weekend Meetup)**; Ai là triệu phú - Số phát sóng ngày 30/3 (Who Wants to Be a Millionaire? - Issue on March 30); Thế giới Rap – King of Rap; Thần tượng đối thần tượng (The Heroes); Trời sinh một cặp (The Heaven-born Couple)
Impressive Documentary	Program of the Year
**Hòa hợp dân tộc: Chuyện chưa kể** **(National Reconciliation: The Untold Story)**; Đoạn trường vinh hoa (The Glorious Pain); Nẻo đường hội ngộ (The Road to Reunion); Ngày hòa bình (Peace Day); Ra khơi - Về dấu ấn ngoại giao Việt Nam năm 2020 (Sail Away - About Vietnam's Diplomatic Imprint in 2020)	**Mưa lũ lịch sử miền Trung** **(Historic Rain & Flood in the Central Region)**; Đón Tết cùng VTV: Đi theo bóng mặt trời (Welcoming Tết with VTV: Follow the Sun); Mùa đoàn tụ 2021 (Season of Reunion 2021); Ngày hội toàn dân (Festival Day of All Citizens); Ngày trở về: Trái tim có nắng (Return Day: Sunshine in the Heart)

== Presenters/Awarders ==
Order	Presenter/Awarder	Award
1	Nguyễn Thị Thu Hiền	Impressive Topical Image
2	Quyền Linh & Bảo Thanh	Impressive Artist
3	Lê Quốc Minh	Impressive Documentary
4	Lê Khanh	Impressive Actor
4	Lê Khanh	Impressive Actress
5	Xuân Bắc and his son (Bi)	Impressive Children's Program
6	Đỗ Hùng Dũng & Đỗ Mỹ Linh	Impressive Culture/Sport Program
7	Đỗ Thanh Hải (presented by Đinh Tiến Dũng & Bảo Trâm Idol)	Impressive Entertainment Program
8	Trung Anh & Mai Ngọc	Impressive Drama
9	Đinh Hương	Impressive TV Presenter
10	Lê Ngọc Quang	Program of the Year

== Special performances ==
Order	Artist	Performed
1	Phạm Anh Duy & Bùi Dương Thái Hà with Thăng Long Drum Crew	"Mặt trời ngày mới"
2	Phong Windy	"Hành trình nhiệm màu"
3	Bích Phương & Phúc Du	"Diệu kỳ Việt Nam"
4	Mỹ Linh (with traditional instruments by Mặt Trời Đỏ Band) and a letter reading session by Chu Diệp Anh & Hồng Nhung	"Cảm ơn và xin lỗi" (COVID-19 Anti-epidemic Medical Team Tribute)
5	Mỹ Anh & Wren Evans	"Một ngày mới"
6	Bùi Anh Tuấn & Bảo Anh	"Thanh xuân của chúng ta"
7	Hoàng Dũng with Màu Nước Band	"Bữa tiệc của giác quan"
8	Thanh Sơn, Khả Ngân, Hà Trung, Lương Thanh, Quang Thắng, Anh Thơ (The cast of 11 tháng 5 ngày)	"Gác lại âu lo" (11 tháng 5 ngày OST)
9	Lâm Bảo Ngọc & GDucky	"Thanh xuân có nhau"
10	Văn Mai Hương	"Take me to the sun"
11	Trung Quân Idol & Minh Tốc & Lam	"Thế giới tuyệt vời"
12	Đinh Hương	"Cuộc sống muôn màu"
13	Hoàng Dũng, Lâm Bảo Ngọc, Đinh Hương, Phong Windy	"Ngàn ước mơ Việt Nam"
