= Vua tiếng Việt =

- Developed by: Bùi Thu Thủy; Khuất Ly Na
- Directed by: Nguyễn Quốc Hưng; Nguyễn Quốc Anh
- Presented by: Nguyễn Xuân Bắc
- Judges: See Advisory board
- Opening theme: Vua tiếng Việt (sáng tác: Lưu Hà An)
- Ending theme: Vua tiếng Việt (sáng tác: Lưu Hà An)
- Country of origin: Vietnam
- Original language: Vietnamese
- No. of seasons: 2
- No. of episodes: 36

Production
- Producer: Tạ Bích Loan
- Production location: Trường quay S14
- Running time: 60-70 minutes (including ads)
- Production companies: Vietnam Television; Bee Communications (exploit advertising)

Original release
- Network: VTV3
- Release: September 10, 2021 – present

Vua tiếng Việt (lit. 'King of Vietnamese') is a Vietnamese television quiz show featuring Vietnamese vocabulary and language, produced by Vietnam Television. The programme is aired on 8:30 pm every Friday on VTV3, starting from 10 September 2021, with the main host Nguyễn Xuân Bắc.

== Gameplay ==
Four contestants participate in every episode, where they have to go through a total of 4 rounds. At the end of each round, a player with the lowest score will be eliminated from the game, and the scores are reset to 0 before the next round.

Starting from 17 September 2021, the questions in an episode are mostly revolve around the main theme of that episode.

=== Round 1: Reflex ===
Each player has 90 seconds to answer a pack of 13 questions with different requirements (examples of requirements include, 'choose the correctly spelled word,' 'match the letters into a word/phrase,' 'count the number of nouns/verbs/adjectives in a sentence,' 'write the correct word,' 'fill in the word in a folk song/proverb,' 'fill in a letter in the word,'...). Players get 1 point for each correct answer. They are able to pass a question, but incorrect answers will not be awarded any points and the question will not return; if time remains, the host will ask the questions that the player skipped before. The player's part will end when time runs out or when all the questions have been answered.

In each turn, when required, the stage lights will run randomly to select a player.

If two or more players have the same lowest score, additional questions will be asked (according to the gameplay of the current round, with no time limit but no scoring), The player who answers correctly will advance to round 2. This will repeat until there is only 1 player left, and this player should be eliminated. The number of sub-questions is equal to the number of candidates to participate minus 1.

=== Round 2: Explain ===
Three contestants take turns to perform these tasks: one person describes a word chosen by the host, and the others guess what the word is. The 'describer' has 60 seconds to describe the requested word (body language is not allowed), whereas the remaining players hit the button to win the right to answer. If a wrong answer is given, the clock will continue so that the describer continue to describe the world until the time runs out or someone answers correctly, then the clock will stop and both the describer and the person who answered correctly will get some points as follows:

- Correct answer in 0 to 15 seconds: 4 points
- Correct answer in 16 to 30 seconds: 3 points
- Correct answer in 31 to 45 seconds: 2 points
- Correct answer in 46 to 60 seconds: 1 point
- After 60th second: 0 point

It is illegal for the describer to speak out any part of the requested word, and the word will be passed. After every two words (without any penalty), the description will be passed to the next player.

After 6 words (without breaking the rules), the player with the lowest score in this round will be disqualified. In case there are 2 players with the same score and the lowest score, an extra word will be given and explained by the other player (no time limit and score) to determine the 2 players to go on.

=== Round 3: Strings ===
In this round, 2 players will arrange 9 sentences from jumbled words to form correct and meaningful sentences, each question has 30 seconds to answer. The player hits the button first to win the right to answer; the correct answer will be awarded 1 point. The game will end in one of the following four situations:

- Players who get 5 correct answers first win immediately;
- No one gets 5 correct answers after 9 questions, then the person with more points (e.g. 3 - 2, 4 - 3,...) will win;
- A player leads by a number of points that the opponent cannot equalize on the remaining questions (e.g.: A gets 4 points and B gets 1 point after 7 questions, A wins as B can only add up to 2 points );
- The score is tied after 9 questions, there will be 1 sub-question (which is also a sequence of words; no time limit and no points), who answers this question correctly first will win.

In the end, the winner will advance to the Usurpation round, the rest will be eliminated.

=== Special round: Usurpation ===
Candidates for special round will answer 3 questions, with the following content in turn:

==== Season 1 ====
- Question 1: Find 2 words that are synonyms (close in meaning) or opposite in meaning to the given word.
- Question 2: Find 3 words that are antonyms or synonyms (close in meaning) to the given word.
- Question 3: Make a poem with 4 lines in length according to the verse form chosen at random and in which there must be a given keyword. The player chooses the poetic form by drawing lots; from episode 8 (October 29, 2021) to episode 18 (January 7, 2022) is spinning a wheel in which there are 2 special spaces (increasing the prize by 5 million VND and adding 30 seconds of thinking). When spinning (drawing) into one of the two special spaces, the contestant will receive the corresponding perks and need to return until hitting one of the certain poetic forms.

5 letters	7 letters	Song thất lục bát	Lục bát	Free verse	Ngũ ngôn Đường luật	Extra 5 million VND	Extra 30 seconds

The questions in this round are all assessed by the advisory board. At least, 2 advisory committee members are required to agree for an answer/poem to be accepted. In some cases (in the first 2 questions), an answer may not be approved by the advisory board but still be counted due to matching the corresponding definition in the program's dictionary.

The contestant have 30 seconds to answer each question; they must answer correctly the previous question correctly to answer the next one. If you answer any question incorrectly, the game will be over. If you pass sentence 3, that player will become the "King of Vietnamese" of the week and receive 30 million VND. This person will then be faced with 2 choices: either stop the game to bring back the money they have (If they stop at the 60 million or 90 million mark, the player will give the ring) or wear the 'challenging' green ring and sit on the "throne" to challenge other players next week and have a chance to increase the prize money.

When someone is on the "throne", the rules of the game will change: both the challenger and the defending champion will compete (the person who is in the position from the previous episode will only compete in this round in the next episode, before that there will be 4 new contestants)).

- In the first question, the challenger's answer is checked first.
- In the second question, the incumbent's answer is checked first.
- In the third question, each person (challenging and standing) will make a separate poem, in the form of a poem drawn by MC Xuan Bac. The Advisory Committee will evaluate each poem to decide the winner (If the Advisory Committee does not accept both, another keyword will be given and both people must write 1 more poem, also in the case of accepting both poems, the advisory board will choose the final winner. If the advisory board only accepts one poem, the person approved by the advisory board will win).

In the event that the defending champion fails, they will lose all their prize money and have to return the ring to the program. At this time, the program will continue, the challenger will have to solve the remaining questions to win the position of "King of Vietnamese". If successful, the challenger will receive 30 million VND and stand in front of 2 options as above.

If the challenger fails, the game is over and the defending champion wins immediately and gets an increased prize. At this time, the incumbent will also face the same 2 options as above (in week 4, if the incumbent wins, the incumbent will leave with 180 million).

If both the challenger and the challenger answer correctly, both will continue to play until the challenger fails or reaches question 3, at which point the advisory board will decide the winner.

==== How to answer ====
In each question, the answers are given after the thinking time has expired. However, the player can also reply immediately while the time is still running (this is not generally applicable). The answers given often need to be pre-written on the player's draft page.

In the first two sentences, the player can write more answers than required (5 words maximum), as long as there are enough correct answers. For question 3, they need to write down at least the first and last words of each verse (no need to memorize the poem).

== Payout structure ==
Player's prize money starts at VND 40 million (30 million in season 1). If the usurper wins the special round but does not receive this bonus and continues to return to the show, he/she will have to accept the next week's challenge to increase the available amount, and so on until the 4th week with the highest prize of 320 million VND (180 million in season 1). Below is the prize money players will win if they pass special round. The more times they pass this round, the higher the amount they win. Receiving 320 million VND, players will also permanently own the challenge ring.

Week	Amount received	
Week	Season 1	Season 2
1	30.000.000 VNĐ	40.000.000 VNĐ
2	60.000.000 VNĐ	80.000.000 VNĐ
3	90.000.000 VNĐ	160.000.000 VNĐ
4	180.000.000 VNĐ	320.000.000 VNĐ

== Advisory board ==
Each episode has the appearance of 3 members of the advisory board. In addition to the task of grading questions for the usurpation round, they also regularly provide explanations for some content (words, poems...) appearing in the program.

- Assoc. Prof. Dr. Pham Van Tinh - General Secretary of the Vietnam Association of Linguistics
- Doctor of Science in Literature Doan Huong
- Writer and journalist Hoang Anh Tu
- Journalist Nguyen Nhu Mai
- Writer Di Ly
- Master of Literature Researcher Ngo Huong Giang
- Doctor of Literature Do Thanh Nga
- Journalist Phan Dang
- Doctor of Linguistics Do Anh Vu
- Writer Truong Quy
- Poet Lu Mai
- Poet Huu Viet

== Reach the throne ==
This is a list of contestants that have ever won the show. The ultimate winning players (180 million VND in season 1, 320 million VND from season 2 on) are bolded, both their name and the amount of the prize. Contestants who receive 90 million VND or less are recorded with the same amount of winnings they have. If the incumbent is usurped, the prize they currently have before being usurped will be crossed out.

Season	Episode	Date	Date	Prize money	Note
1	2	17 September 2021	Phạm Thu Hien	30.000.000 VND	The first to win the Usurpation round
1	**10**	**12 November 2021**	**Phung Khac Bac Linh**	**180.000.000 VND - KING OF VIETNAMESE**	The first "King of Vietnamese"
1	11	19 November 2021	Pham Son Tung	~~30.000.000 VND~~	Was usurped in episode 12
1	12	26 November 2021	Ngo Trung Kien	30.000.000 VND	Successful usurpation
1	15	17 December 2021	Nguyen Duc Manh (Manh Melody)	30.000.000 VND	The first celebrity winner
1	16	24 December 2021	Bui Ngoc Cong	~~30.000.000 VND~~	Was usurped in episode 17
1	17	31 December 2021	Dao Thi May	30.000.000 VND	Successful usurpation
1	18	7 January 2022	Nguyen Anh Tuan	35.000.000 VND	The first person to win all 4 rounds and get a bonus of 5,000,000 VND in the usurpation round
1	19	14 January 2022	Nguyen Thi My Linh	30.000.000 VND	
1	**24**	**4 March 2022**	**Nguyen Thuy Huong**	**180.000.000 VND - KING OF VIETNAMESE**	The only female player in season 1 to accept the challenge, and also the only to write more than 1 poem during her participation in the programme (5 poems from episodes 21–24) and the only female player in the series. 2nd champion in the programme. She is also the first female contestant to receive the title of "King of Vietnamese" and the last "King of Vietnamese" of season 1.
2	17	13 January 2023	Pham Huu Quynh	30.000.000 VND	
2	**22**	**March 3 2023**	**Nguyen Quang Minh (Oplus)**	**320.000.000 VND - KING OF VIETNAMESE**	First "King of Vietnamese" of season 2, and also the first celebrity to do that.
2	24	March 17 2023	Phan Thi Thao Ngan	30.000.000 VND	
2	27	April 7 2023	Ha Viet Hoang	30.000.000 VND	
2	**31**	**May 5 2023**	**Nguyen Thanh Huong**	**320.000.000 VND - KING OF VIETNAMESE**	The last "King of Vietnamese" of season 2.
3	**9**	**April 26 2024**	**Do Viet Hung**	**320.000.000 VND - KING OF VIETNAMESE**	The first pre-adult player to receive the title of "King of Vietnamese" throughout the series, and also the first contestant on season 3 and the youngest to do that.

== Reception ==
Thanks to the novel content about the language, along with the combination of entertainment and knowledge of Vietnamese, King of Vietnamese is a program that creates attraction for the audience. In the program, players have to overcome questions related to Vietnamese grammar and words, and at the same time are challenged to react quickly. Many topics in the program, especially combining words into words, were widely shared and enthusiastically responded by many netizens. Many comments from the audience said that the richness and diversity of Vietnamese made them scratch their heads and solve puzzles.

According to Kantar Media's statistics based on the viewership rate measured in 4 major cities, Hanoi, Ho Chi Minh City, Da Nang and Can Tho, the show is listed in the top 10 watched TV shows in September 2021, October 2021, November 2021, and December 2021. Many viewers have also signed up to join the program to try their hand at Vietnamese, which proves the show's great appeal to television audiences.

=== Ratings ===
Source: Kantar Media, according to data on 10 TV shows with the highest ratings in the month, statistics in 4 big cities (Hanoi, Da Nang, Ho Chi Minh City and Can Tho).

Year	Month	Rating	Position (in top 10)	Ref.
2021	9	3,5%	9	
2021	10	3,2%	10	
2021	11	4,1%	4	
2021	12	3,5%	5	
2022	1	3,8%	7	

== Changes ==
- From October 29, 2021, the draw box for poetry in special round will be replaced by a multicolored vertical wheel.
- From November 5, 2021, the show will start welcoming the audience into the studio, when the COVID-19 epidemic in Hanoi is under control.
- From January 14, 2022, the draw box for poetry in special round will be reused, and the audience will not be allowed to enter the studio due to the outbreak of COVID-19 in Hanoi again.

== Broadcasting ==
=== Main broadcast ===
- September 10, 2021 - now: Friday 20:30

=== Replay ===
- On VTV3: 04:30 on Mondays, 08:50 on Saturdays (Episode 1 reruns on January 8, 2022) and 03:00 on Sundays
- On VTV4: Tuesday 14:15, Wednesday and Sunday 18:15
- On VTV5
- On VTV5 Southwest: 03:15 on Saturday and 21:15 on Sunday
- On VTV5 Central Highlands: Thursday 20:30
- On VTV's digital platforms

=== Broadcast pause ===
During the broadcast, there were several times when the show halted or changed the recording and broadcast as planned, mostly due to coincident with special events. The postponed shows were back on air the following week. Specifically:

- On February 4, 2022, and February 11, 2022, the program temporarily stopped broadcasting to spend time on the program during the Lunar New Year.
- After the March 4, 2022 broadcast, the show will end its first season and plan a second season. The second season premiered on September 23, 2022.
- On December 16, 2022 and December 23, 2022, the program is expected to temporarily stop broadcasting to make room for the art program Young Aspiration 13 and the national finale of the Miss Vietnam 2022 contest.

== See more ==
- Vietnamese language
