= Living with Mother-in-Law =

Vietnamese television drama series

- Sống chung với mẹ chồng
- Genre: Drama
- Based on: Living with Mother-in-Law
- Directed by: Vũ Trường Khoa
- Starring: Bảo Thanh; Lan Hương; Anh Dũng; Việt Anh
- Theme music composer: Lê Anh Dũng
- Opening theme: "The Fragile Happiness" ("Hạnh phúc mong manh") - Performed by Khánh Linh
- Country of origin: Vietnam
- Original language: Vietnamese
- No. of seasons: 1
- No. of episodes: 34 (32 original + 2 extra)

Production
- Producer: Vietnam Television Film Center
- Cinematography: Trương Quốc Huy; Ngô Thanh Tĩnh
- Running time: 45 mins

Original release
- Network: VTV1
- Release: 5 April – 30 June 2017

Living with Mother-in-Law (Vietnamese: Sống chung với mẹ chồng) is a television drama series produced by Vietnam Television Film Center, Vietnam Television, directed by Vũ Trường Khoa. It aired from 5 April to 30 June 2017, every Wednesday to Friday (last four episodes aired on Thursday and Friday) at 20:45.

== Story ==
The drama revolves around conflicts and problems in the relationship between Minh Vân (Bảo Thanh) and her mother-in-law, Phương (Lan Hương), when living under the same roof. At the same time, the young husband/son - Thanh (Anh Dũng) in the film must stand in the middle of the "war" between his mother and wife. It is also the root of discordance between the newly-wed couple and damage to the family relationship. As shown in the series, many other couples also suffer from conflicts, which stem from their mother-in-law.

== Cast ==
=== Main ===
- Lan Hương as Phương (Thanh's mother)
- Bảo Thanh as Minh Vân
- Anh Dũng as Thanh
- Trần Đức as Phương (Thanh's father)

=== Supporting ===
- Nguyễn Phúc Lưu Lan Hương as Mrs. Bang (Van's mother)
- Nguyễn Công Lý as Mr. Bang (Van's father)
- Thu Quỳnh as Trang (Vân's best friend)
- Danh Tùng as Tùng (Trang's husband)
- Việt Anh as Sơn
- Minh Phương as Dieu (Tùng's mother)
- Thanh Tú as Bích (Bằng's sister)
- Thanh Hương as Như (Vân's coworker)
- Hương Giang as Trâm (Vân's coworker)
- Nguyễn Ngọc Thoa as Phương's mother
- Thu Hà as Hằng
- Trang Cherry as Diệp
- Trang Moon as Thảo (Tùng's sister)
- Thế Nguyễn as Linh (Vân's brother)
- Vân Anh as Nhật (Linh's girlfriend)
- Anh Đức as Long (Vân's old coworker)
- Hoàng Anh as Chief
- Mạnh Cường as Cường (Vân's boss)
- Cẩm Vân as Chi
- Diệp Bích as Neighbour
- Thu Huyền as Phương's neighborhood

== Awards ==
- 2017 VTV Awards: Impressive Actress (Bảo Thanh)
