= 2023 VTV Awards =

Edition of Vietnam TV awards show

- Date: January 1, 2024
- Site: Hồ Gươm Theatre, Hàng Bài Ward, Hoàn Kiếm District, Hanoi
- Hosted by: Anh Tuấn, Nguyễn Thúc Thùy Tiên

Television coverage
- Network: VTV1
- Duration: 120 minutes

The 2023 VTV Awards (Vietnamese: Ấn tượng VTV 2023) is a ceremony honouring the outstanding achievement in television on the Vietnam Television (VTV) network from December 2022 to November 2023. It was produced as a New Year show named Happy New Year - Multicolor 2024.

== Details ==
This year, VTV Awards will have a total of 8 categories, going through 2 rounds of voting. In round 1, all nominations in each category will be announced and voted from 12:00 on December 1 to 12:00 on December 23, 2023. The voting points of the nominations in round 1 will be 50% of the points voted by the audience via VTVgo and SMS plus 50% scored by the Professional Council. The Top 3 of each category will be announced at the end of round 1, in which 3 categories: Impressive Documentary, Impressive Young Face and Creative Program of the Year will end voting. The remaining 5 categories continue to enter round 2 from 12:00 on December 25, 2023, to 12:00 on January 1, 2024, to choose the winner with results based on 100% of the points voted by the audience.

This year's ceremony also marks the 10th anniversary of the award.

== Winners and nominees ==
(Top 3 are listed first with the winners denoted in bold)

Impressive Drama
**Gia đình mình vui bất thình lình (Suddenly Happy Family)**; Cuộc đời vẫn đẹp sao (How Beautiful Life Is Still); Đừng làm mẹ cáu (Don't Vex a Mom!); Cảnh sát hình sự: Biệt dược đen (Criminal Police: Dark Drugs); Cuộc chiến không giới tuyến (Borderless Battle)
Impressive Actor	Impressive Actress
**Nhan Phúc Vinh - Đừng làm mẹ cáu (Don't Vex a Mom!), Không ngại cưới, chỉ cần một lý do (We Just Need One Reason to Get Married)**; Hoàng Hải - Cuộc đời vẫn đẹp sao (How Beautiful Life Is Still), Cuộc chiến không giới tuyến (Borderless Battle); Trọng Lân - Không ngại cưới, chỉ cần một lý do (We Just Need One Reason to Get Married), Gia đình mình vui bất thình lình (Suddenly Happy Family); Đỗ Duy Nam - Cảnh sát hình sự: Biệt dược đen (Criminal Police: Dark Drugs); Võ Hoài Nam - Món quà của cha (Father's Gift); Mạnh Trường - Đừng nói khi yêu (In Love, Don't Say)	**Kiều Anh - Gia đình mình vui bất thình lình (Suddenly Happy Family)**; Khả Ngân - Gia đình mình vui bất thình lình (Suddenly Happy Family); Lan Phương - Gia đình mình vui bất thình lình (Suddenly Happy Family); Thanh Hương - Cuộc đời vẫn đẹp sao (How Beautiful Life Is Still); Quỳnh Kool - Đừng làm mẹ cáu (Don't Vex a Mom!); Thu Quỳnh - Cuộc chiến không giới tuyến (Borderless Battle)
Impressive Entertainment Program	Impressive Documentary
**Chị đẹp đạp gió rẽ sóng**; Có hẹn cùng thanh xuân; Hành trình rực rỡ; Cassette hoài niệm; Hát ca bềnh bồng; Thần tượng âm nhạc Việt Nam – Vietnam Idol 2023	**Mảnh ký ức**; Cây Lin-den mùa xanh lá; Hố đen; Đường đến hòa bình; Không lùi bước; Người ơi đừng khóc cuối đường
Radiating Image	Impressive Young Face
**Nguyễn Thị Oanh cùng 4 huy chương vàng phi thường tại SEA Games 32**; Cờ Tổ quốc theo ngư dân vươn khơi; "Cõng" vật liệu lên núi làm nhà cho người nghèo; Đêm trắng khoa cấp cứu bệnh viện Nhi; Hy sinh giữa thời bình trong cuộc chiến chống tội phạm ma túy; "Chim trời, cá nước miền Tây"; Thực hiện tâm nguyện của chồng; Tình người trong đám cháy chung cư mini tại Thanh Xuân, Hà Nội; Vinh quang con đứng bên Người; Vớt rác trên vịnh Hạ Long	**Nguyễn Thị Oanh - athletics athlete**; **Phạm Thiên Ân - film director**; **Hà An Huy - singer**; Duy Đào - designer; Tăng Duy Tân - singer, songwriter; DTAP - music producer; Phạm Quang Huy - shooting athlete; Nguyễn Thị Thanh Nhã - football athlete; Khánh Vy - MC, digital content creator
Creative Program of the Year
**Hoa xuân ca**; Gala Tiếng Việt - Tiếng "Mẹ" thân thương; Tạp chí kinh tế đặc biệt - Net Zero; 12 ngày đêm Lằn ranh lịch sử; Bước nhảy mùa xuân; Buổi sáng đầu tiên 2023 - Bình minh ấm; Mừng tuổi đầu năm - Cái Tết của Mèo con

== Presenters/Awarders ==
Order	Presenter/Awarder	Performed
1	Xuân Bắc & Nguyễn Thúy Hiền	Radiating Image
2	Thanh Sơn & Phan Minh Huyền	Impressive Actor
2	Thanh Sơn & Phan Minh Huyền	Impressive Actress
3	Nhan Phúc Vinh & Thu Phương	Impressive Entertainment Program
4	Trung Anh & Thụy Vân	Impressive Drama
5	Hồng Ánh & Tuấn Dương	Impressive Documentary
6	Nguyễn Thanh Lâm	Impressive Young Face
7	Lê Ngọc Quang	Creative Program of the Year

== Special performances ==
Order	Artist	Performed
1	Dzung & M.A Hải Phượng with Mộc Cầm band, NBK Music Club, People's Police Academy Club, Sao Tuổi Thơ Club	"Múa sạp xoè hoa (The Dance of the People)"
2	Erik	"Ghen"
3	Kim Tử Long, Minh Hiền, Hồng Duyên, Cao Bá Hưng	3 regions medley
4	GiGi Hương Giang	"Miền an nhiên"
5	Hà An Huy	"Ngã tư không đèn"
6	Giana ft. Hà An Huy	"Yêu đậm âm điệu"
7	Hồ Quỳnh Hương	"Anh"
8	Thu Phương & Erik	"Cô gái đến từ hôm qua"
9	Ngọc Anh 3A	"Hãy yêu khi ta còn bên nhau"
10	Anh Tú	"Sẽ không dừng lại"
11	Thu Phương	"Ngại gì shine"
12	GiGi Hương Giang, Hà An Huy, Giana & Anh Tú	"Bữa tiệc của giác quan"
