= 2015 VTV Awards =

- Date: September 6, 2015
- Site: Quần Ngựa Stadium, Liễu Giai Ward, Ba Đình District, Hanoi
- Hosted by: Đinh Tiến Dũng, Thành Lộc, Minh Hà

Television coverage
- Network: VTV1
- Duration: 155 minutes

The 2015 VTV Awards (Vietnamese: Ấn tượng VTV - Ấn tượng 2015) is a ceremony honouring the outstanding achievement in television on the Vietnam Television (VTV) network from August 2014 to July 2015. It took place on 6 September 2015 in Hanoi and hosted by Đinh Tiến Dũng, Thành Lộc & Minh Hà.

== Winners and nominees ==
(Winners denoted in bold)

Impressive New Drama
**Tuổi thanh xuân** **(Forever Young)**; Đam mê nghiệt ngã (Severe Passion); Mưa bóng mây (Sunshower); Trái tim có nắng (Sunshine in My Heart); Bão qua làng (Storm Through the Countryside)
Impressive Actor	Impressive Actress
**Kang Tae-oh** - **Tuổi thanh xuân** **(Forever Young)**; Hồng Đăng - Tuổi thanh xuân (Forever Young); Trọng Trinh - Mưa bóng mây (Sunshower); Huy Khánh - Đam mê nghiệt ngã (Severe Passion); Đỗ Duy Nam - Sóng ngầm (Groundswell)	**Nhã Phương** - **Tuổi thanh xuân** **(Forever Young)**; Shin Hye-sun - Tuổi thanh xuân (Forever Young); Thúy Hà - Mưa bóng mây (Sunshower); Phan Minh Huyền - Trái tim có nắng (Sunshine in My Heart), Lời thì thầm từ quá khứ (Whisper from the Past); Như Quỳnh - Sóng ngầm (Groundswell)
Impressive MC	Impressive Singer
**Trấn Thành**; Công Tố; Nguyên Khang; Hạnh Phúc; Quỳnh Chi	**Mỹ Tâm**; Tóc Tiên; Isaac; Khởi My; A#
Impressive Comedian	Impressive Stage
**Trấn Thành**; Xuân Bắc; Trường Giang; Việt Hương; Hoài Linh	**Hòa âm Ánh sáng** **(The Remix Vietnam)**; Gala Ngày trở về (Return Day: The Gala); Chào 2015 (Hello 2015); Đón Tết cùng VTV 2015 (Welcoming Tet with VTV 2015); Hát mãi khúc quân hành (Endless Marching Songs)
Impressive Topical Image
**The process of rescuing the workers in the case of Đạ Dâng hydroelectric tunnel collapse** **(in the 19h News Reports by VTV Phú Yên)**; Seizing tons of fake functional foods (in the 19h News Reports by News Committee); The revival image of Hanoi electric train (in 24h Moving by VTV24 News Center); Investigative reporters approach the scene of illegal exploited old-growth forest in Nà Hầu Nature Reserve [in the program Danh sách đen (The Black List)]; Rescuing the workers in the case of Đạ Dâng hydroelectric tunnel collapse (in Morning Coffee with VTV3 by the Television of Youth)
Impressive Humanistic Image	Impressive Cultural/Social/Scientific/Educational Program
**Choreographing Võ Thị Ngọc Nữ** **[in Điều ước thứ 7 (The Saturday Wish)]**; Vũ Thanh Quỳnh's changes after plastic surgery [in Thay đổi cuộc sống (Change Life)]; Former RVN Soldier Nguyễn Ngọc Lập visits Trường Sa [in the gala Ngày trở về (Return Day: The Gala)]; Hoàn the Teacher [in Điều ước thứ 7 (The Saturday Wish)]; Scenes in the drama Tuổi thanh xuân (Forever Young)	**Thay đổi cuộc sống** **(Change Life)**; MH370 - Hành trình chưa kết thúc (MH370 - Unfinished Journey); 24h Moving, the Issue on 10 October 2014; Bước nhảy mùa xuân (Spring Dance Steps); Gala Ngày trở về (Return Day: The Gala)
Impressive Entertainment Program	Impressive Musical Program
**Bố ơi! Mình đi đâu thế?** **(Dad! Where Are We Going? Vietnam)**; Ơn giời cậu đây rồi! (Thank God You're Here Vietnam); Chung cư 22+ (The Apartment 22+); Một bước để chiến thắng (One Step to Win); Hóa đơn may mắn (The Lucky Bill)	**Hòa âm Ánh sáng** **(The Remix Vietnam)**; Giai điệu tự hào (The Proud Melodies); Nhân tố bí ẩn (The X Factor Vietnam); Tuổi 20 hát (The Twenties Sing); Bài ca không quên (The Unforgettable Song)
Impressive Guest	Netizen's Favourite Program
**Võ Thị Ngọc Nữ** [in Điều ước thứ 7 (The Saturday Wish)]; Mrs. Kim Lành [in Điều ước thứ 7 (The Saturday Wish)]; Trần Lực and his son, Trần Tú (Bờm); Hoàng Bách and his son, Hoàng Minh (Tê Giác) [both in Bố ơi! Mình đi đâu thế? (Dad! Where Are We Going? Vietnam)]; Huỳnh Nguyễn Hồng Chiến [in Đường lên đỉnh Olympia (Way to Olympia Peak)]	**Bữa trưa vui vẻ** **(Happy Lunch)**; 5S Online; Tiệm bánh hoàng tử bé (Little Prince Bakery)

== Presenters ==
Order	Presenter	Award
1	Kim Tiến, Thanh Hùng	Impressive MC
2	Xuân Bắc, Trường Giang	Impressive Guest
3	Thủy Tiên, Noo Phước Thịnh	Impressive Entertainment Program
4	Chu Chí Thành, Nguyễn Hoàng Điệp	Impressive Topical Image
4	Chu Chí Thành, Nguyễn Hoàng Điệp	Impressive Humanistic Image
5	Huy Tuấn, Nhã Phương, Tùng Dương	Impressive Singer
5	Huy Tuấn, Nhã Phương, Tùng Dương	Impressive Musical Program
6	Nguyễn Quang Dũng, Tóc Tiên	Impressive Stage
7	Vũ Công Lập, Lê Khanh	Impressive Cultural/Social/Scientific/Educational Program
8	Anh Tuấn, Viết Thái, Anh Dũng, Phương Anh, Lương Giang (Bótay.kom cast)	Impressive Actor
8	Anh Tuấn, Viết Thái, Anh Dũng, Phương Anh, Lương Giang (Bótay.kom cast)	Impressive Actress
9	Đỗ Thanh Hải, Ninh Dương Lan Ngọc	Impressive New Drama
10	Jennifer Phạm, Bình Minh	Impressive Comedian
11	Phạm Việt Tiến, Nguyễn Cao Kỳ Duyên	Netizen's Favourite Program

== Special performances ==
Order	Artist	Performed
1	Thành Lộc	VTV Parody Song
2	Đinh Mạnh Ninh, Hoàng Quyên, Dương Hoàng Yến, Hà Anh	"My Kool Vietnam"
3	Lan Anh	"Bài ca hy vọng"
4	Trần Tiến, Hồ Trung Dũng, Quang Anh	"Mặt Trời bé con"
5	Saxophone Trần Mạnh Tuấn; The Choir of MUCA	"Bài ca không quên" (In Memoriam performance)
6	Tùng Dương	"Ca dao em và tôi"
7	Hồ Trung Dũng & Uyên Linh	"Trái tim không ngủ yên"
8	Tóc Tiên	"Ngày mai" (from Hòa âm Ánh sáng)
9	Oplus	"Cứ thế mà đi"

== In Memoriam ==
Celebrating 45 years since the first TV program was broadcast, the In Memoriam part tributes several important former leaders in VTV history.

- Trần Lâm
- Huỳnh Văn Tiểng
- Lý Văn Sáu
- Vũ Tá Duyệt
- Nguyễn Văn Hán
- Hoàng Tuấn
- Chu Doanh
