= Tạ Bích Loan =

Vietnamese television journalist

Tạ Bích Loan (born 7 October 1968) is a Vietnamese television journalist and executive.

== Biography ==
Tạ Bích Loan was born in Ninh Bình, Vietnam, and attended Ly Thuong Kiet High School in Hanoi, also known as Viet Duc High School. She completed a PhD in journalism at Moscow State University in Russia before returning to Vietnam to work in television. She created the long-running television programmes The Path to Olympia and Contemporary People. Loan has also developed VTV6, the first national youth TV channel.

Tạ Bích Loan has also lectured in journalism at Hanoi National University and was head of the university's radio and television department.

In 2008, Loan led Vietnam Television's adoption of the newly created code of ethics for Vietnamese journalists, and further developed the code for use by the television network.
