= Kang Tae-oh =

South Korean actor (born 1994)

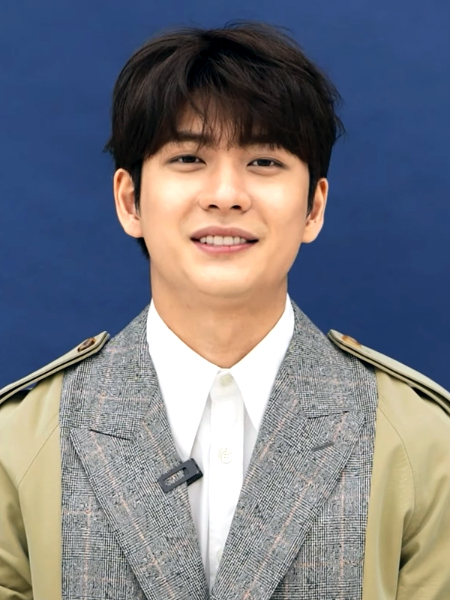
- Kang in April 2021
- Born: Kim Yoon-hwan; June 20, 1994 (age 32); Incheon, South Korea
- Education: Konkuk University
- Occupations: Actor; singer
- Years active: 2013–present
- Agent: Man of Creation (M.O.C)

Korean name
- Hangul: 김윤환
- Hanja: 金潤煥
- RR: Gim Yunhwan
- MR: Kim Yunhwan

Stage name
- Hangul: 강태오
- RR: Gang Taeo
- MR: Kang T'aeo

Kim Yoon-hwan (Korean: 김윤환; born June 20, 1994), known professionally as Kang Tae-oh (Korean: 강태오) is a South Korean actor and singer. He was a member of the actor group 5urprise. He rose to international popularity for his starring role in the television series Extraordinary Attorney Woo (2022).

== Career ==
In 2013, Kang made his acting debut in the web series After School: Lucky or Not together with the members of 5urprise – actor group formed by talent agency Fantagio. He then played a supporting role in MBC weekend drama Flower of Queen in 2015.

He also made his name in Vietnam by playing the male lead role Lee Jun-su in the Korean-Vietnamese joint drama Forever Young.

In 2019, Kang joined the KBS historical drama The Tale of Nokdu, which earned him critical acclaim for acting in historical dramas; in the same year, he made a special appearance in the MBC drama Love with Flaws playing the role of Oh Yeon-seo's ex-boyfriend. He later appeared in the Netflix original series My First First Love.

In 2020, Kang appeared in the JTBC drama Run On where he played an art student alongside Choi Soo-young. Later that same year, his contract with Fantagio expired and he moved to Man of Creation (M.O.C), an agency established by his former agency's managers.

In 2021, Kang appeared in the drama Doom at Your Service and the one-act drama Drama Special – The Effect of One Night on Farewell.

In 2022, Kang made a special appearance in the drama Thirty-Nine as a friend of Lee Tae-hwan's character. Later in the same year, he played one of the main characters in the drama Extraordinary Attorney Woo, which was his last drama appearance before enlisting for his military service in September 2022. He ranked first for five consecutive weeks according to the TV topic analysis company Good Data Corporation in TV-OTT Drama Performer Buzzworthiness.

== Personal life ==
=== Military enlistment ===
On August 31, 2022, Kang announced at a fan meeting that he would enlist for his mandatory military service on September 20, 2022. He conducted basic military training at the 37th Infantry Division Jeungpyeong County, North Chungcheong Province and then served as an assistant training instructor with the same division. Kang was discharged on March 19, 2024, after serving as an active duty soldier for 18 months.

=== Philanthropy ===
On August 10, 2022, Kang donated ₩20 million to help those affected by the 2022 South Korean floods through the Hope Bridge Korea Disaster Relief Association.

== Filmography ==
=== Film ===
| Year | Title | Role | Notes | Ref. |
|---|---|---|---|---|
| 2014 | Slow Video | Successor | Cameo | |
| 2018 | Feng Shui | Won-kyung | | |
| 2023 | Don't Buy the Seller | Det. Na Seung-hyun | Cameo | |
| 2026 | The Intern | Kang Min-wook | Cameo | |

=== Television series ===
| Year | Title | Role | Notes | Ref. |
|---|---|---|---|---|
| 2013 | Drama Festival – Save Wang Jo-hyeon | Nam Nam-cheol | one act-drama | |
| 2013–2014 | Miss Korea | Ma Ae-ri's son | | |
| 2014 | Forever Young | Lee Jun-su | | |
| 2015 | Flower of Queen | Heo Doug-gu | | |
| 2015 | Second 20s | young Woo-chul | | |
| 2015 | The Dearest Lady | Choi Young-kwang | | |
| 2016 | Forever Young 2 | Lee Jun-su / Jace | | |
| 2017 | You Are Too Much | Lee Kyung-soo | | |
| 2018 | Short | Kang Ho-young | | |
| 2018 | Evergreen | Kim Jin-woo | | |
| 2019 | The Tale of Nokdu | Cha Yul-mu / Prince Neungyang | | |
| 2019 | Love with Flaws | Jung Tae-oh | Cameo (Episode 1,6) | |
| 2020–2021 | Run On | Lee Young-hwa | | |
| 2021 | Doom at Your Service | Lee Hyun-kyu | | |
| 2021 | KBS Drama Special – A Moment of Romance | Cha Min-jae | one-act drama | |
| 2022 | Thirty-Nine | Park Hyun-joon's friend | Cameo (episode 11) | |
| 2022 | Extraordinary Attorney Woo | Lee Jun-ho | | |
| 2025 | The Potato Lab | So Baek-ho | | |
| 2025 | Moon River | Crown Prince Lee Kang | | |

=== Web series ===
| Year | Title | Role | Ref. |
|---|---|---|---|
| 2013 | After School: Lucky or Not | Kang Tae-oh | |
| 2015 | To Be Continued | Street Punk | |
| 2019 | My First First Love | Choi Hoon | |

=== Television shows ===
| Year | Title | Role | Notes | Ref. |
|---|---|---|---|---|
| 2017 | Law of the Jungle | Cast member | Episode 252–255 | |

== Accolades ==
=== Awards and nominations ===
Name of the award ceremony, year presented, category, nominee of the award, and the result of the nomination
| Award ceremony | Year | Category | Nominee / Work | Result | Ref. |
|---|---|---|---|---|---|
| APAN Star Awards | 2022 | Best Couple | Kang Tae-oh (with Park Eun-bin); Extraordinary Attorney Woo | Nominated | |
| Asia Artist Awards | 2017 | Rising Star Award | You Are Too Much | Won | |
| KBS Drama Awards | 2019 | Best New Actor | The Tale of Nokdu | Won | |
| KBS Drama Awards | 2019 | Netizen Award | The Tale of Nokdu | Nominated | |
| KBS Drama Awards | 2019 | Best Couple | Kang Tae-oh (with Jang Dong-yoon); The Tale of Nokdu | Nominated | |
| KBS Drama Awards | 2021 | Best Actor in Drama Special/TV Cinema | Drama Special – A Moment of Romance | Nominated | |
| MBC Drama Awards | 2017 | Excellence Award, Actor in a Weekend Drama | You Are Too Much | Nominated | |
| MBC Drama Awards | 2025 | Top Excellence Award, Actor in a Miniseries | Moon River | Won | |
| MBC Drama Awards | 2025 | Best Couple Award | Kang Tae-oh (with Kim Se-jeong); Moon River | Won | |
| VTV Awards | 2015 | Impressive Actor | Forever Young | Won | |
| VTV Awards | 2017 | Impressive Actor | Forever Young 2 | Nominated | |

=== State honors ===
Name of country, year given, and name of honor
| Country | Organization | Year | Honor or Award | Ref. |
|---|---|---|---|---|
| South Korea | Newsis K-Expo Cultural Awards (Note: Established in 2019 and co-sponsored by Korea's Ministry of Culture, Sports and Tourism, Ministry of Foreign Affairs, Korea Creative Content Agency, Seoul Metropolitan Council and the Seoul Tourism Organization, it awards cultural icons, businesses, and individuals who have contributed greatly to Hallyu, the Korean wave.) | 2022 | Seoul Metropolitan Council Chairman's Award | |

=== Listicles ===
Name of publisher, year listed, name of listicle, and placement
| Publisher | Year | Listicle | Placement | Ref. |
|---|---|---|---|---|
| Forbes | 2023 | Korea Power Celebrity | 40th | |
