= 2024 VTV Awards =

Edition of Vietnam TV awards show

- Date: January 1, 2025
- Site: Hồ Gươm Theatre, Hàng Bài Ward, Hoàn Kiếm District, Hanoi
- Hosted by: Anh Tuấn, H'Hen Niê

Television coverage
- Network: VTV1
- Duration: 149 minutes

The 2024 VTV Awards (Vietnamese: Ấn tượng VTV 2024) is a ceremony honouring the outstanding achievement in television on the Vietnam Television (VTV) network from November 2023 to November 2024. It was produced as a New Year show named Happy New Year 2025.

== Details ==
The 2024 VTV Awards had a total of 8 categories and votes went through 2 rounds of voting. In round 1, all nominations in each category were announced and voted from 12:00 on December 1 to 12:00 on December 23, 2024. The voting points of the nominations in round 1 consisted of 50% of the points voted by the audience via VTVgo and SMS plus 50% scored by the Professional Council. The Top 3 of each category were announced at the end of round 1, in which 3 categories: Impressive Documentary, Impressive Young Face and Creative Program of the Year will end voting. The remaining 5 categories continued to enter round 2 from 12:00 on December 25, 2024, to 12:00 on January 1, 2025, to choose the winner with results based on 100% of the points voted by the audience.

== Winners and nominees ==
Results were as follows:

(Top 3 are listed first with the winners denoted in bold)

Impressive Drama
**Độc đạo (The Only Way)**‡; Gặp em ngày nắng (Meet You on a Sunny Day); Trạm cứu hộ trái tim (Heart Rescue Station)
Impressive Actor	Impressive Actress
**Nguyễn Duy Hưng – Độc đạo (The Only Way), Người một nhà (As a Family)**‡; Nguyễn Quang Sự – Trạm cứu hộ trái tim (Heart Rescue Station); Nguyễn Long Vũ – Đi giữa trời rực rỡ (Walking Under the Bright Sky)	**Nguyễn Thanh Hương – Người một nhà (As a Family), Hoa sữa về trong gió (Milk Flowers in The Wind)**‡; Lương Thu Trang – Trạm cứu hộ trái tim (Heart Rescue Station); Hoàng Hà – Chúng ta của 8 năm sau (Us of 8 Years Later)
Impressive Entertainment Program	Impressive Documentary
**Anh trai vượt ngàn chông gai** **(Yeah1 Group)**‡; Đảo thiên đường (Công ty Cát Tiên Sa); Giai điệu tự hào: Tình em (Ban Sản xuất các chương trình giải trí)	**Điện Biên Phủ - Nhìn từ nước Pháp (Ban Truyền hình Đối ngoại)**‡; Bác sĩ Trần Duy Hưng - Một phẩm cách Hà Nội (Trung tâm Phim tài liệu); Cánh hạc vẫn bay (Trung tâm Truyền hình Việt Nam tại TP.HCM)
Radiating Image	Impressive Young Face
**Các lực lượng tìm kiếm người dân làng Nủ bị vùi lấp do sạt lở sau bão số 3**‡; Hình ảnh em bé Điện Biên dưới mưa; Hình ảnh Lá cờ tổ quốc được xếp bởi gần 10.000 người tại quảng trường Ngọ Môn, Huế	**Nhà thiết kế Phan Đăng Hoàng**‡; **Ca sĩ Rhyder**‡; **Vận động viên Đua thuyền Nguyễn Thị Hương**‡
Creative Program of the Year	Impressive Digital Transformation Application of the Year
**Dưới lá cờ quyết thắng**‡; Ngày trở về: Như hạt phù sa; Hoa xuân ca 2024: Hành trình trở về	**Ứng dụng định danh điện tử VNeID (Bộ Công an)‡**; Ứng dụng thuế điện tử eTax Mobile (Tổng cục Thuế); Ứng dụng xem truyền hình trên Internet VTVgo (Đài Truyền hình Việt Nam); Ứng dụng EVNHANOI (Điện lực Hà Nội); Ứng dụng RiceMoRe (Bộ Nông nghiệp)

== Presenters/Awarders ==
Order	Presenter/Awarder	Performed
1	Nguyễn Tuấn Dương & Hoài Anh	Radiating Image
2	Nhan Phúc Vinh & Kiều Anh	Impressive Actor
2	Nhan Phúc Vinh & Kiều Anh	Impressive Actress
3	Tùng Dương & Thụy Vân	Impressive Entertainment Program
4	Trung Hiếu & Trần Thu Hà	Impressive Drama
5	Đỗ Đức Hoàng & Hồng Nhung	Impressive Documentary
6	Tạ Quang Đông & Quỳnh Nga	Impressive Young Face
7	Đỗ Thanh Hải & Hồng Diễm	Creative Program of the Year
8	Nguyễn Thanh Lâm & Anh Tuấn	Impressive Digital Transformation Application of the Year

== Special performances ==
Order	Arist	Performed
1	Tự Long, Hà Lê, Hà Myo	Âm Sắc Dân Gian
2	Trần Thu Hà, Dàn Nhạc Asp Và Ban Nhạc Ánh Sáng	Khoảnh Khắc Tuyệt Vời
3	Mỹ Mỹ, Vũ Thảo My	Chỉ Cần Anh Muốn - Không Ai Khác Ngoài Em
4	Bùi Công Nam, Học Sinh Trường Hope, Hợp Xướng ASP	Phép Chia Lạ Kỳ
5	Quốc Thiên, Vũ Thảo My	Đêm Cô Đơn
6	Isaac	Gọi Cho Anh - Nơi Anh Không Thuộc Về
7	Linh 3T	Hào Quang
8	Bùi Công Nam, Trang Pháp	Trái Đất Ôm Mặt Trời
9	Thanh Lam, Bigdaddy	Cho Em Một Ngày - Những Cơn Mưa Dài Cuối Đông
10	Quốc Thiên, Uyên Linh	Mong Anh Tình Về
11	Ca Nương Kiều Anh, Trang Pháp	Đào Liêu - Duyên Số
12	Tùng Dương, Uyên Linh	Con Đường Ta Chọn
