= Thu Hà =

Vietnamese actress

Thu Ha (born November 6, 1969, in Tuyen Quang) is a Vietnamese actress. In 2013 she was nominated for the Best Actress Award at the 17th National Film Festival for her performance in Nhin Ra Bien Ca (Looking to the Sea).
