= VTV Awards =

Annual awards show held by Vietnam Television

- Current: 2024 VTV Awards
- Country: Vietnam
- Presented by: Vietnam Television
- First award: 2014
- Website: antuong.vtv.vn

The VTV Awards (Vietnamese: Ấn tượng VTV, lit. 'Highlights of VTV') is an awards ceremony presented by Vietnam Television (VTV) to honour the most notable television productions aired on its network. It was launched in 2014 and is usually held in early September each year until 2021, when the date was moved to 1 January the following year. From 2026, through its official Facebook fanpage, the producers announced the temporary suspension of the show's next awards ceremony due to a lack of explanation.

== Rules ==
The VTV Awards comprises two rounds:

=== Round 1 ===
- Nominees are selected by crews from departments/centers under VTV.
- Voting by a jury or/and audiences will pick out Top 5 of each category (Top 3 in 2023). Before 2019, the result only based on audience's vote. Later, the votes are collected from both jury and audience except 2021 when the nominees for Top 10 & Top 5 are completely jury's picks.
- Round 1 ends a week before the ceremony (a month in 2021–2022). After this round, the score and votes will be refreshed in order to continue voting in Round 2.

=== Round 2 ===
- Shortlist nominees continues to get votes by jury and audience in this round (with a ratio of 50:50), except 2023 when voting points are collected entirely from the audience.
- From 2014 to 2021:
  - Round 2 ends at 07:09 on the day of ceremony (the numbers 7 and 9 represent 7 September, the date of VTV's launch)
  - The organizers will pick out the person/group/product(s) voted the most in each category. The winners will be honoured in the live broadcast on the evening of the same day on VTV1.
  - Audience can vote via SMS, or on the official site of the awards, or VTVGo mobile app in 2021.
- In 2022:
  - Round 2 ends at 23:59 on 30 December.
  - The votes are collected from both jury and audience with a ratio of 50:50 picking out the Top 3, and the winner will be honoured in the award ceremony on 1 January.
  - Audiences can only vote via VTVGo mobile app.
- In 2023:
  - Round 2 ends at 12:00 on 1 January 2024.
  - The votes are collected entirely from the audience via VTVGo mobile app & SMS.

== Categories ==
=== Current categories ===
Currently, the awards has given prizes in 8 categories:

- Radiating Image: since 2022 (replacing Impressive Topical Image)
- Impressive Entertainment Program: 2014-2015, 2021-2023
- Impressive Documentary: since 2018
- Impressive Drama: since 2016 (2014/15 as Impressive New Drama)
- Impressive Actor: since 2015 (split from Impressive Artist)
- Impressive Actress: since 2015 (split from Impressive Artist)
- Impressive Young Face: 2023
- Creative Program of the Year: 2023
- Impressive Digital Transformation Application of the Year: 2024

=== Discontinued categories ===
- Impressive Editor-On-Air (merged with Impressive MC to Impressive TV Presenter since 2015)
- Impressive Humanistic Image: 2014 & 2015
- Impressive Topical Image: 2014-2021
- Impressive Stage: 2014 & 2015
- Netizen's Favourite Program: 2014 & 2015
- Impressive Comedian: 2015 to 2017 (split from Impressive Artist)
- Impressive Artist (Singer): 2014 & 2021 as Impressive Artist, 2015-2020 as Impressive Singer (originally split from Impressive Artist), 2022 as Promising Artist
- Impressive Cultural/Social Science/Educational Program: 2017-2020 (2014-16 as Impressive Cultural/Social/Scientific/Educational Program)
- Impressive Musical Program: 2016 & 2017
- Impressive TV Presenter: 2016-2022 (2014/15 as Impressive MC)
- Impressive Cultural/Sport Program: 2021-2022 (split from Impressive Cultural/Social Science/Educational Program)
- Impressive Education and Children's Program: 2021-2022 (split from Impressive Cultural/Social Science/Educational Program)
- Impressive News Reports: 2022 (replacing Impressive Topical Image)
- Figure of the Year: 2016-2021 (2014/15 as Impressive Guest)
- Jury's Impressive Figure of the Year: 2017
- Program of the Year: 2016-2022

== Awards for individuals ==
=== Actor/actress ===
Year	Winning actor	Winning actress
2015	Kang Tae-oh	Nhã Phương
2016	Hồng Đăng	Nhã Phương
2017	Hoàng Dũng	Bảo Thanh
2018	Hồng Đăng	Lan Phương
2019	Trung Anh	Bảo Thanh
2020	Xuân Nghị	Hồng Diễm
2021	Mạnh Trường	Hồng Diễm
2022	Thanh Sơn	Phan Minh Huyền
2023	Nhan Phúc Vinh	Kiều Anh
2024	Duy Hưng	Thanh Hương

=== Promising Artist/Young Face ===
Year	Winner
2022 (as Promising Artist)	Mỹ Anh - singer, songwriter
2023 (as Impressive Young Face)	Nguyễn Thị Oanh - athletics athlete Phạm Thiên Ân - film director Hà An Huy- singer
2024 (as Impressive Young Face)	Phan Đăng Hoàng - Culture; Rhyder- singer Nguyễn Thị Hương - Sport

=== Presenter ===
Year	Winner
2014	Công Tố (MC) / Hoài Anh (Editor-on-Air)
2015	Trấn Thành
2016	Ngọc Trinh
2017	Thành Trung
2018	Ngô Kiến Huy
2019	Thành Trung
2020	Việt Hoàng
2021	Tuấn Dương
2022	Đức Bảo

=== Artist/singer ===
Year	Winner
2014 (Artist)	Mỹ Tâm
2015 (Singer)	Mỹ Tâm
2016 (Singer)	Hồ Văn Cường
2017 (Singer)	Vũ Cát Tường
2018 (Singer)	Mỹ Tâm
2019 (Singer)	Đông Nhi
2020 (Singer)	Hà Lê
2021 (Artist)	Xuân Bắc

=== Guest/figure ===
Year	Winner
2014	Đàm Vĩnh Hưng
2015	Võ Thị Ngọc Nữ
2016	Trần Lập
2017	44 male teachers of Tri Lễ 4 primary school, Nghệ An; Nguyễn Thị Ánh Viên (Jury's prize)
2018	Vietnam national under-23 football team
2019	PhD. Professor Nguyễn Thanh Liêm
2020	Medics and physicists at Bạch Mai Hospital

=== Comedian ===
Year	Winner
2015	Trấn Thành
2016	Trường Giang
2017	Xuân Bắc

== Awards for productions ==
=== Drama ===
Year	Winner
2014	Vừa đi vừa khóc (Walking Crying)
2015	Tuổi thanh xuân (Forever Young)
2016	Zippo, mù tạt và em (Zippo, Mustard and You)
2017	Người phán xử (The Arbitrator)
2018	Cả một đời ân oán (Life of Love and Feud)
2019	Về nhà đi con (Come Home, My Dear)
2020	Hoa hồng trên ngực trái (Roses on the Left Chest)
2021	Hương vị tình thân (The Taste of Intimacy)
2022	Thương ngày nắng về (Cherish the Sunny Day)
2023	Gia đình mình vui bất thình lình (Suddenly Happy Family)
2024	Độc đạo (The Only Way)

==== Precursor prize ====
Starting in 2003, 'The Most Beloved Vietnam Television Dramas' Voting Contest (Vietnamese: Cuộc thi bình chọn phim truyền hình Việt Nam được yêu thích nhất) is held annually or biennially by VTV Television Magazine to honor Vietnamese television dramas broadcast during the year(s) on two channels VTV1-VTV3. The awards ceremony takes place early next year.

Year	Winner
2004	Khi đàn chim trở về (When the Birds Return) / Cảnh sát hình sự: Phía sau một cái chết (Criminal Police: Behind a Case of Death)
2005	Đường đời (Walks of Life)
2007	Cảnh sát hình sự: Chạy án (Criminal Police: Evading Justice)
2008	Luật đời (Rules of Life)
2010	Bỗng dưng muốn khóc (Suddenly, I Want to Cry)
2011	Bí thư tỉnh ủy (Provincial Party Secretary)
2013	Cầu vồng tình yêu (Rainbow of Love)

=== Documentary ===
Year	Winner
2018	VTV Đặc biệt: Hành trình bất tận (VTV Special: Endless Journey)
2019	VTV Đặc biệt: Đường về (VTV Special: The Way Back)
2020	VTV Đặc biệt: Giữa những quê hương (VTV Special: Among the Motherlands)
2021	Hòa hợp dân tộc: Chuyện chưa kể (National Reconciliation: The Untold Story)
2022	Bốn mùa trong rừng thẳm (Four Seasons in the Forest)
2023	Mảnh ký ức (A Piece of Memory)
2024	Điện Biên Phủ - Nhìn từ nước Pháp

=== Image ===
==== Humanistic image ====
Year	Winner
2014	Kidney failure patient's wedding: Loan & Vượng
2015	Choreographing Võ Thị Ngọc Nữ

==== Topical image ====
Year	Winner
2014	Chinese warship fires a water cannon towards Vietnam's ship
2015	The rescue of workers following the Đạ Dâng hydroelectric tunnel collapse
2016	Last meeting of a mother under cancer treatment with her son
2017	The epic in Gạc Ma island
2018	Celebrations for Vietnam's U23 football team, and the image of Vietnamese team at the Changzhou Stadium in the match against Uzbekistan
2019	North Korea–United States Hanoi Summit
2020	The miraculous moment in the heart of the COVID-19 pandemic in Đà Nẵng
2021	The landslide at Trà Leng

==== Radiating image ====
Year	Winner
2022	"Bình yên con nhé!"
2023	"Nguyễn Thị Oanh with 4 extraordinary gold medals at SEA Games 32"
2024	"Các lực lượng tìm kiếm người dân làng Nủ bị vùi lấp do sạt lở sau bão số 3"

=== Impressive Digital Transformation Application of the Year ===
Year	Winner
2024	Ứng dụng định danh điện tử VNeID (Bộ Công an)

=== Program ===
Category	Year	Winner
Netizen's Favourite	2014	5S Online
Netizen's Favourite	2015	Bữa trưa vui vẻ (Happy Lunch)
Musical	2015	Hòa âm Ánh sáng (The Remix Vietnam)
Musical	2016	Chào 2016 (Hello 2016)
Musical	2017	Bài hát hay nhất (Sing My Song Vietnam)
Entertainment	2014	Bữa trưa vui vẻ (Happy Lunch)
Entertainment	2015	Bố ơi! Mình đi đâu thế? (Dad! Where Are We Going? Vietnam)
Entertainment	2021	Cuộc hẹn cuối tuần (The Weekend Meetup)
Entertainment	2022	Cuộc hẹn cuối tuần: Nghệ sĩ Đen Vâu (The Weekend Meetup: Artist Đen Vâu)
Entertainment	2023	Chị đẹp đạp gió rẽ sóng (Sisters Who Make Waves - Vietnam)
Entertainment	2024	Anh trai vượt ngàn trong gai (Call Me by Fire - Vietnam)
Cultural/Social/Scientific/Educational (2014–2016); Cultural/Social Science/Educational (2017–2020); Cultural/Sport (since 2021); Children's (2021) – Education/Children's (since 2022)	2014	Cây đàn Điện Biên (The Guitar in Điện Biên)
Cultural/Social/Scientific/Educational (2014–2016); Cultural/Social Science/Educational (2017–2020); Cultural/Sport (since 2021); Children's (2021) – Education/Children's (since 2022)	2015	Thay đổi cuộc sống (Changing Life)
Cultural/Social/Scientific/Educational (2014–2016); Cultural/Social Science/Educational (2017–2020); Cultural/Sport (since 2021); Children's (2021) – Education/Children's (since 2022)	2016	Cặp lá yêu thương (Loving Leaves)
Cultural/Social/Scientific/Educational (2014–2016); Cultural/Social Science/Educational (2017–2020); Cultural/Sport (since 2021); Children's (2021) – Education/Children's (since 2022)	2017	VTV Đặc biệt: Giấc mơ bay (VTV Special: Flying Dream)
Cultural/Social/Scientific/Educational (2014–2016); Cultural/Social Science/Educational (2017–2020); Cultural/Sport (since 2021); Children's (2021) – Education/Children's (since 2022)	2018	Điều ước thứ 7: Bản hòa tấu cha và con (The Saturday Wish: Father and Son Ensemble)
Cultural/Social/Scientific/Educational (2014–2016); Cultural/Social Science/Educational (2017–2020); Cultural/Sport (since 2021); Children's (2021) – Education/Children's (since 2022)	2019	Ký ức vui vẻ (Happy Memories)
Cultural/Social/Scientific/Educational (2014–2016); Cultural/Social Science/Educational (2017–2020); Cultural/Sport (since 2021); Children's (2021) – Education/Children's (since 2022)	2020	Quán thanh xuân: Về nhà xem phim (A Place for Our Youth: Go Home for a Film)
Cultural/Social/Scientific/Educational (2014–2016); Cultural/Social Science/Educational (2017–2020); Cultural/Sport (since 2021); Children's (2021) – Education/Children's (since 2022)	2021	Cultural/Sport: Tổ quốc trong tim (Homeland in the Heart)
Cultural/Social/Scientific/Educational (2014–2016); Cultural/Social Science/Educational (2017–2020); Cultural/Sport (since 2021); Children's (2021) – Education/Children's (since 2022)	2021	Children's: Thiếu niên nói (Teens Speak)
Cultural/Social/Scientific/Educational (2014–2016); Cultural/Social Science/Educational (2017–2020); Cultural/Sport (since 2021); Children's (2021) – Education/Children's (since 2022)	2022	Cultural/Sport: Gala Việc tử tế 2022: Vì đất nước cần những trái tim (The Kind Deeds: Because the Country Needs Hearts)
Cultural/Social/Scientific/Educational (2014–2016); Cultural/Social Science/Educational (2017–2020); Cultural/Sport (since 2021); Children's (2021) – Education/Children's (since 2022)	2022	Education/Children's: Chung kết Đường lên đỉnh Olympia năm 2022 (Road to the Olympian Peak 2022: The Final)
Program of the Year	2016	Gặp nhau cuối năm 2016 (Final Meeting 2016)
Program of the Year	2017	Gặp nhau cuối năm - Táo Quân xuân Đinh Dậu (Final Meeting 2017)
Program of the Year	2018	Gặp nhau cuối năm - Táo Quân 2018 (Final Meeting 2018)
Program of the Year	2019	Giai điệu tự hào: Những người con của biển (Melodies of Pride: Children of the Sea)
Program of the Year	2020	VTV Đặc biệt: Park Hang Seo - Những câu chuyện chưa kể (VTV Special: Park Hang-seo - The Untold Stories)
Program of the Year	2021	Mưa lũ lịch sử miền Trung (Historic Floods in the Central Region)
Program of the Year	2022	Khúc tráng ca hòa bình (The Great Song of Peace)
Creative Program of the Year	2023	Hoa xuân ca (Musical Spring Blossom)
Creative Program of the Year	2024	Dưới lá cờ quyết thắng

=== News reports ===
Year	Winner
2022	Mua bán ma túy tại trung tâm điều trị Methadone (Narcotics trade at Methadone treatment center)

=== Stage ===
Year	Winner
2014	Gala Như chưa hề có cuộc chia ly (As If We Were Never Apart: The Gala)
2015	Hòa âm Ánh sáng (The Remix Vietnam)
