= Ngọc Khánh =

Ngọc Khánh Ward Phường Ngọc Khánh Phường Cầu Giấy
- Ward (Class-II)
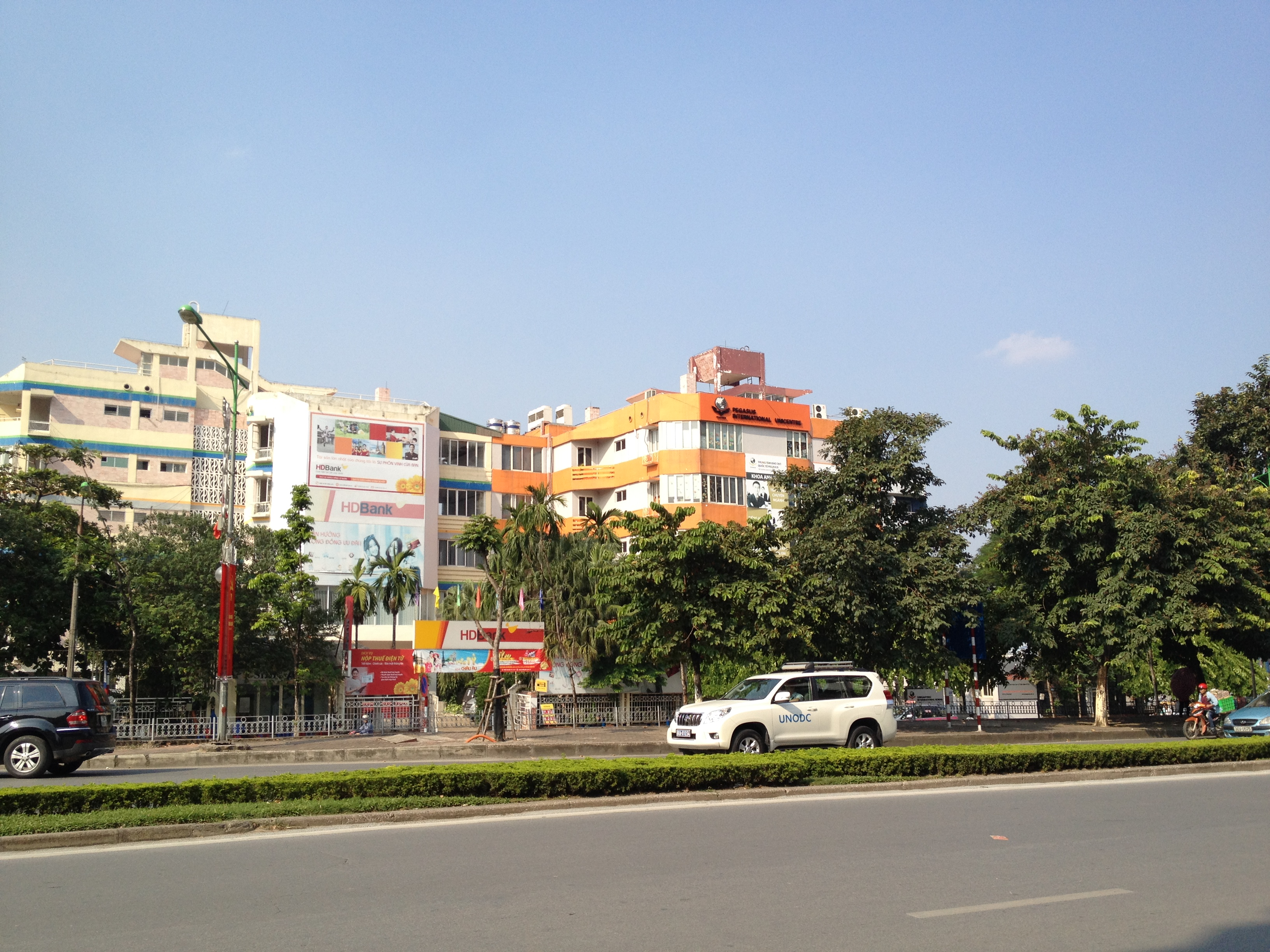
- Pegasus International UniCentre at Kim Mã Street, October 16, 2015.
- Interactive map of Ngọc Khánh Ward
- Location within Vietnam
- Country: Vietnam
- Region: Red River Delta
- Municipality: Hà Nội
- Establishment: 1981
- Central hall: No.525, Kim Mã Street, Ngọc Khánh Ward

Government
  - Type: Ward-level authority
  - People Committee's Chairman: Viên Hải Tuệ
  - People Council's Chairman: Trần Viết Cường
  - Front Committee's Chairman: Lê Việt Cường
  - Party Committee's Secretary: Nguyễn Thị Vượng

Area
  - Total: 1.04 km^{2} (0.40 sq mi)

Population (2022)
  - Total: 21,182
  - Density: 20,367/km^{2} (52,750/sq mi)
  - Ethnicities: Kinh; Tanka; Others
- Time zone: UTC+7 (Indochina Time)
- ZIP code: 10000–11109 (Note: An official code from December 31, 2023, to present.)
- Climate: Cwa
- Website: Lang.Hanoi.gov.vn; Lang.Hanoi.dcs.vn

Ngọc Khánh [ŋa̰ʔwk˨˩:ŋa̰ʔwk˨˩] is a former ward of Hanoi the capital city in the Red River Delta of Vietnam.

== History ==
The modern area of Ngọc Khánh Ward has previously belonged to two of the 13 barracks, which was established in the period 1028–1054 by Emperor Lý Thái Tông to control the number of immigrants from Tràng An the former capital. They have been called as hamlets Ngọc Khánh (玉慶) and Thủ Lệ (Note: "Thủ Lệ" is originally a way to read from the Thanh-Nghệ-Tịnh region, but it must be read as Thủ Lễ, which is similar to "Ước Lễ".) (守礼). In particular, Ngọc Khánh has always maintained a larger area and population, not to mention the presence of the big lake (Note: Ngọc Khánh Lake.) right next to, so over time it has become more important than Thủ Lệ in the administrative history of Hanoi.

From July 1, 2025, its entire area is part of new wards Láng and Ngọc Hà.

== See also ==
- Cầu Giấy
- Láng
