= List of VTV dramas broadcast in 2019 =

This is a list of VTV dramas released in 2019.

←2018 - 2019 - 2020→

== VTV Special Tet dramas ==
This drama airs from 21:40 to 22:30, 1st to 4th lunar-new-year days on VTV1.

Broadcast	Title	Eps.	Prod.	Cast and crew	Theme song(s)	Genre	Notes
5–8 Feb	Xin chào, người lạ ơi! (Hello, Stranger!)	4	VFC	Trịnh Lê Phong (director); Nguyễn Mạnh Cường (writer); Trọng Trinh, Hương Dung, Tiến Lộc, Phương Anh, Doãn Quốc Đam, Thanh Hương, Viết Thái...	Thương anh thì về (Love Me Then Be With Me) by Hồng Phi	Drama, Romance, Family	

== VTV1 Weeknight Prime-time dramas ==
New time slot in 2019 as VTV resizes the duration from 45 minutes down to 30 minutes. It was sampled with 2017 drama Lặng yên dưới vực sâu (adjusted from 32 original episodes to 40 episodes) before officially launched.

These dramas air from 21:00 to 21:30, Monday to Friday on VTV1.

Broadcast	Title	Eps.	Prod.	Cast and crew	Theme song(s)	Genre	Notes
8 Apr–12 Aug; Extra story: 13–17 Aug (on vtvgiaitri)	Về nhà đi con (Come Home, My Dear)	85+5	VFC	Nguyễn Danh Dũng (director); Nguyễn Thu Thủy, Trịnh Khánh Hà, Thủy Tiên, Thu Trang (writers); Trung Anh, Thu Quỳnh, Bảo Thanh, Bảo Hân, Trọng Hùng, Quốc Trường, Hoàng Dũng, Ngân Quỳnh, Quang Anh, Tuấn Tú, Hoàng Anh Vũ, Phùng Khánh Linh, Quỳnh Nga, Tiến Lộc, Kim Ngọc, Ngô Thủy Tiên, Thúy Hà, Vương Anh, Minh Cúc, Đào Hoàng Yến... Cameo: Trọng Trinh (Extra Story: Lê Na, Maya, Mạnh Quân)	Cảm ơn con nhé (Thank You, My Dear) by Quốc An	Family, Drama, Marriage	Inspired by Khi người đàn ông góa vợ bật khóc (2013). Delayed 6 eps on 6–8 May, 10 & 31 May and 21 Jun. Formerly: Nước mắt của gà trống (Rooster's Tears)
13 Aug–1 Nov	Những nhân viên gương mẫu (Exemplary Employees)	51	VFC	Lê Mạnh (director); Nguyễn Mạnh Cường (writer); Lan Hương 'Bông', Diễm Hương, Lương Thu Trang, Nguyễn Kim Oanh, Tiến Lộc, Mạnh Cường, Vân Dung, Minh Hằng, Ngô Thu Thuận, Đỗ Duy Nam, Tiến Minh, Hà Trung, Nguyễn Trang, Tiến Ngọc, Tiến Đạt, Khuất Quỳnh Hoa, Mạnh Hưng, Nguyễn Ngọc Anh, Danh Tùng...	Những nhân viên gương mẫu (Exemplary Employees) by Đinh Mạnh Ninh	Drama, Office	Delayed 4 eps on 2 Sep and 16-18 Oct.
4 Nov 2019– 9 Mar 2020	Sinh tử (Life and Death)	80(30′); Replay: 50 (50′)	VFC	Nguyễn Khải Hưng, Nguyễn Mai Hiền (directors); Phạm Ngọc Tiến (writer); Trọng Trinh, Hoàng Dũng, Việt Anh, Thúy Hà, Mạnh Trường, Chí Nhân, Doãn Quốc Đam, Bá Anh, Phan Thắng, Quỳnh Nga, Trọng Hùng, Thanh Hương, Đỗ Kỷ, Văn Hát, Bình Xuyên, Dương Đức Quang, Huyền Sâm, Vĩnh Xương, Danh Thái, Duy Hưng, Việt Thắng, Đặng Tất Bình, Đình Chiến, Minh Tiệp, Ngọc Trung, Phú Kiên, Tuấn Cường, Tạ Minh Thảo, Lương Thanh...		Political, Crime, Drama	Ordered by Supreme People's Procuracy. Delayed 1 ep on 18 Nov. Formerly: Cơn mưa đầu mùa (The First Rain of the Season)

== VTV3 Weeknight Prime-time dramas ==
=== First line-up ===
These dramas air from 20:00 to 20:30, Monday to Thursday on VTV3.

Broadcast	Title	Eps.	Prod.	Cast and crew	Theme song(s)	Genre	Notes
16 Jan–7 May	Mối tình đầu của tôi (My Very First Love)	60	TVHub	Nam Cito, Bảo Nhân (directors & writers); Ninh Dương Lan Ngọc, Bình An, Chi Pu, B Trần, Xuân Lan, Diễm Châu, Hứa Minh Đạt, Phương Bella, Mạnh Lân, Thạch Thu Huyền, Thùy Dung, Hồng Ngọc, Thái Quốc, Vân Anh, Tùng Yuki, Hạnh Thúy, Khải Hoàn, Trọng Khang...	Chờ ngày anh nhận ra em (Waiting For The Day You Found Me) by Thùy Chi Chẳng để em xa anh (Won't Let You Leave Me) by Đức Phúc	Romance, Drama	Based on K-drama She Was Pretty (MBC 2015). Delay 4 eps (4–7 Feb) during Tet holiday
8 May 2019– 10 Jun 2020	Xin chào hạnh phúc - Mùa 3 (Hello Happiness - Season 3)	Ep 272 to Ep 514	VTV and VietCom Film	Nguyễn Bảo Trâm (executive producer); Various Artists		Drama	A series comprises numerous short miniseries. Airs on Fri since Ep 427 (7 Feb 2020).

=== Second line-up ===
==== Monday-Tuesday dramas ====
These dramas air from 21:30 to 22:20, Monday and Tuesday on VTV3.

Broadcast	Title	Eps.	Prod.	Cast and crew	Theme song(s)	Genre	Notes
8 Apr–16 Jul	Nàng dâu order (Romantic Wife)	30	VFC	Bùi Quốc Việt (director); Thủy Đinh, Thu Hà (idea writers); Lê Huyền (writer); Lan Phương, Thanh Sơn, Minh Vượng, Trọng Trinh, Thanh Hương, Khuất Quỳnh Hoa, Phú Đôn, Thanh Quý, Đình Tú, Phương Oanh, Quỳnh Kool, Hồng Hạnh, Quang Minh, Đức Khuê, Bá Anh, Huyền Sâm, Bích Điệp, Hồng Vương...	Hạnh phúc trong em (The Happiness in Me) by Minh Ngọc	Drama, Family, Romance, Marriage	
22 Jul–12 Nov	Bán chồng (Husband For Sale)	34	VFC	Lê Hùng Phương (director); Hạnh Ngộ, Kim Oanh (writers); Oanh Kiều, Nguyễn Anh Tú, Ngọc Lan, Cao Thái Hà, Trần Nguyên Cát Vũ (Tim), Khổng Tú Quỳnh, Hạnh Thúy, Linh Trung, Bảo Xuyên, Bích Hằng... / Ngân Chi, Phạm Thanh Tú	Đằng sau lời tình vội (Behind the Hurry Love Words) by Đồng Lan; Chạm khẽ giấc mơ (Slightly Touch the Dream) by Lân Nhã	Drama	Adapted from a novel of the same name by Lê Nguyệt
18 Nov 2019– 17 Mar 2020	Tiệm ăn dì ghẻ (The Stepmother Diner)	34	VFC	Nguyễn Đức Hiếu, Nguyễn Thu (directors); Nhiên Phượng, Phi Yến, Thúc An (writers); Dương Cẩm Lynh, Quang Tuấn, Huỳnh Anh, Hồng Kim Hạnh, Kiều Khanh, Anh Tài, Bình An, Huỳnh Hồng Loan, Mỹ Uyên, Cát Vi, Khôi Trần, Tống Yến Nhi...	Mình yêu nhau, yêu nhau bình yên thôi (Let us Love, Love in Peace) by Hà Anh Tuấn & Đinh Hương	Drama	

==== Wednesday–Thursday dramas ====
These dramas air from 21:30 to 22:20, Wednesday and Thursday on VTV3.

Broadcast	Title	Eps.	Prod.	Cast and crew	Theme song(s)	Genre	Notes
24 Apr–1 Aug	Cảnh sát hình sự: Mê cung (Criminal Police: The Labyrinth)	30	VFC	Nguyễn Khải Anh, Trần Trọng Khôi (directors); Nguyễn Trung Dũng (writer); Hồng Đăng, Việt Anh, Hoàng Thùy Linh, Doãn Quốc Đam, Bảo Anh, Anh Đức, Phan Thắng, Nguyễn Huyền Trang, Minh Trang, Công Lý, Hoàng Hải, Xuân Trường, Hương Dung, Nguyễn Kim Oanh, Đỗ Duy Nam, Duy Hưng, Thạch Thu Huyền, Thanh Tú, Vũ Thu Hoài, Thùy Dương, Mạnh Dũng, Hoàng Du Ka, Văn Minh...	Mê cung (The Labyrinth) by Hoàng Thùy Linh	Crime, Drama, Thriller	
7 Aug 2019– 9 Jan 2020	Hoa hồng trên ngực trái (Roses on the Left Chest)	46	VFC	Vũ Trường Khoa (director); Hân Như, Diệu Thúy, Thu Thủy (writers); Hồng Diễm, Ngọc Quỳnh, Hồng Đăng, Diệu Hương, Lương Thanh, Hoàng Cúc, Thanh Quý, Kiều Thanh, Hồng Quang, Trọng Nhân, Phú Đôn, Công Lý, Bích Thủy, Trọng Lân, Trần Tài, Mạnh Hưng, Hồng Nhung, Phụng Nghi, Trí Đức, Lương Giang, Phương Hạnh... Cameo: Chiến Thắng	Vệt nắng nhạt nhòa (The Faded Ray of the Sun) by Thùy Chi	Marriage, Drama, Romance	Formerly: Em đồng ý ly hôn (I Agree to the Divorce)

== VTV3 Weekend Afternoon dramas ==
These dramas air from 14:00 to 14:50, Saturday and Sunday on VTV3.

Broadcast	Title	Eps.	Prod.	Cast and crew	Theme song(s)	Genre	Notes
5 Jan–1 Jun	Hoa cúc vàng trong bão (Golden Daisy in the Storm)	38	MegaGS	Nhâm Minh Hiền (director); Tường Loan (writer); Hồ Bích Trâm, Hà Trí Quang, Khánh Hiền, Bạch Công Khanh, Công Ninh, Hoài An, Thịnh Vinh, Thủy Phạm, Công Danh, Thu Thủy, Lucy Như Thảo, Xuân Mai, Nguyễn Quỳnh...	Hoa cúc vàng trong bão (Golden Daisy in the Storm) by Bạch Công Khanh	Drama	Delayed 3 eps due to special events.
2 Jun–10 Nov	Đánh cắp giấc mơ (Stolen Dreams)	47	MegaGS	Nguyễn Phương Điền (director); Mỹ Hà (writer); Hạ Anh, Quỳnh Hương, Quốc Huy, Quách Ngọc Tuyên, Lê Thiện, Khánh Huyền, Huỳnh Trang Nhi, Cát Vi, Hạ My, Hồng Lam, Trọng Khang...	Kẻ cắp giấc mơ (Dream Thief) by Phương Thanh	Drama	
16 Nov 2019– 5 Apr 2020	Nước mắt loài cỏ dại (Tears of the Wild Grass)	40	MegaGS	Hoàng Tuấn Cường (director); Nguyễn Thị Mộng Thu (writer); Xuân Phúc, Khương Thịnh, Bella Mai, Mỹ Uyên, Tam Triều Dâng, Minh Đức, Hạnh Thúy, Thạch Thu Huyền, Võ Đăng Khoa, Hoàng Nguyên...	Nước mắt loài cỏ dại (Tears of the Wild Grass) by Vinh Quang	Drama	Delayed 2 eps on 25-26 Jan due to Tet programs.

== Non-recurring dramas ==
These drama was warehoused and now released on VTV channels in the time slots that's originally made for another program or playback dramas.

Broadcast	Title	Eps.	Prod.	Cast and crew	Theme song(s)	Genre	Notes
1-31 Aug	Người giữ lửa (Fire Keeper)	31	Interbrand Vietnam	Bùi Huy Thuần (director); Nguyễn Long Khánh (writer); Phạm Cường, Trần Nhượng, Trần Đức, Thế Bình, Tiến Mộc, Tùng Dương, Linh Huệ, Phú Thăng, Vũ Hải, Duy Thanh, Bắc Việt, Diệu Thuần, Khôi Nguyên, Lý Thanh Kha, Tạ Am, Quang Lâm, Phí Thùy Linh, Văn Huy, Bình Xuyên, Xuân Hậu, Đình Chiến, Nguyễn Thu Hà, Thiên Kiều, Ngọc Dương, Xuân Phúc, Cao Huyền, Vân Anh, Hồng Chương, Ngọc Tản...	Lạc nhịp (Skipped a Beat) by Tiến Minh & Bùi Anh Tuấn	Legal, Political, Drama, Rural	Airs 07:25-08:10, every day on VTV8. Produced in 2014. Preceded & followed by foreign dramas.
23 Aug-26 Sep	Ánh sáng trước mặt (The Light Before Our Eyes)	35	VTV and DaiViet; Film (DVF)	Trần Hoài Sơn, Nguyễn Danh Dũng (directors); Nguyễn Hữu Nhàn, Nguyễn Tham Thiện Kế (writers); Bùi Kim Quy, Lê Minh Đức, Nguyễn Thái Hà, Tống Phương Dung (editors); Anh Tú, Xuân Trường, Minh Hằng, An Chinh, Xuân Tùng, Lâm Tùng, Việt Bắc, Bảo Thanh, Hữu Mười, Thanh Quý, Hoàng Lan, Anh Thư, Hoàng Yên, Phan Minh Huyền, Đỗ Duy Nam, Doãn Quốc Đam, Trọng Hùng, Trần Nghĩa, Mai Chi, Tùng Anh, Lý Thanh Kha, Trịnh Mai Nguyên, Tuân Nghĩa, Mạnh Hùng, Diệu Linh, Năng Tùng, Hà Anh, Yên Minh, Nguyễn Lan Hương, Văn Huy, Thu Hằng, Ngọc Dung, Mai Hương, Đan Sinh, Nguyễn Kim Oanh...	Hà Nội của tôi (Hanoi of Mine) by Hoàng Thu Trang	Historical, Drama	Airs 12:05-12:50 every day on VTV8. Produced in 2014 to celebrate 60 years of Hanoi Liberation. Preceded by a foreign drama. Followed by Chiều ngang qua phố cũ (2016).
3 Dec 2019- 13 Jan 2020 (VTV9); First release: 26-30 Nov 2018 (VTV1, stopped)	Kẻ ngược dòng (The Man Who Goes Against the Current)	30; First rls: 4/30	VFC	Nguyễn Duy Võ Ngọc (director); Nguyễn Quý Dũng (writer); Hà Việt Dũng, Mai Sơn, Dương Hoàng Anh, Dương Cẩm Lynh, Mai Thanh Hà, Lâm Minh Thắng, Lê Bình, Công Hậu, Phương Băng, Quốc Hùng, Ngân Quỳnh, Lê Nam, Tùng Haru, Hải Hùng, Ngô Thành Tá, Lê Bửu Đa, Quang Hòa, Vĩnh San...	'Kẻ ngược dòng' theme song by Nguyễn Anh	Drama, Crime, Action	Airs 17:00-17:45, Mon to Fri on VTV9. Preceded & followed respectively by 2017 dramas Nhà Voi Còi cuối phố & Bước nhảy hoàn vũ.

== See also ==
- List of dramas broadcast by Vietnam Television (VTV)
- List of dramas broadcast by Hanoi Radio Television (HanoiTV)
- List of dramas broadcast by Vietnam Digital Television (VTC)
