= List of VTV dramas broadcast in 2022 =

This is a list of VTV dramas released in 2022.

←2021 – 2022 – 2023→

== VTV Special Tet dramas ==
An extra-story episode in theme of Tết from the series Thương ngày nắng về was released on digital platforms (vtvgo & vtvgiaitri) at 21:30 on the 2nd day of Lunar New Year. The plot was built independently from original storyline.

Broadcast	Title	Eps.	Prod.	Cast and crew	Theme song(s)	Genre	Notes
1 Feb	Thương ngày nắng về: Ngoại truyện (Cherish the Sunny Day: Extra Story)	1 (30’)	VFC	Bùi Tiến Huy (director); Nguyễn Thu Thủy, Nguyễn Nhiệm, Thùy Dương, Lương Ly, Đỗ Lê (writers); Thanh Quý, Lan Phương, Phan Minh Huyền, Nguyễn Ngọc Huyền, Hồng Đăng, Đình Tú, Doãn Quốc Đam, Bá Anh, Bảo Linh, Phạm Tuấn Phong...		Family, Romance, Comedy	

== VTV1 Weeknight Prime-time dramas ==
These dramas air from 21:00 to 21:30, Monday to Friday on VTV1.

- Note: Bão ngầm becomes the first non-VFC drama to be aired in this time slot since 2018, also the second non-VFC drama to be counted as a part of Criminal Police: The Series (after Cuồng phong in 2010). It was shown on the occasion of the 60th anniversary of People's Police traditional day.

Broadcast	Title	Eps.	Prod.	Cast and crew	Theme song(s)	Genre	Notes
21 Feb-7 Jun	Cảnh sát hình sự: Bão ngầm (Criminal Police: Silent Storm)	72	Phương Sáng Film, Hoàng Trà My LLC & VTV	Đinh Thái Thụy (director); Lt Col. Đào Trung Hiếu (writer); Hà Việt Dũng, Cao Thái Hà, Trần Nhượng, Tạ Minh Thảo, Nguyễn Hải, Nguyễn Trọng Hải, Hoàng Nhân, Hoàng Thanh Du, Lý Anh Tuấn, Lê Quang Hòa, Xuân Hiệp, Công Dũng, Trương Hoàng, Mạnh Hùng, Trần Anh Thư, Lê Thanh Hải, Phạm Trung, Châu Thế Tâm, Phạm Đức Toàn, Xuân Khôi, Đặng Tam Thuận, Kim Phượng, Thanh Bi, Nguyễn Loan, Hà Hương, Đinh Y Nhung, Thạch Kim Long, Lê Bê La, Kim Quý, Bình Xuyên, Hoàng Hải Thu, Ly Na Trang...	Độc hành (Walk Alone) by Tùng Dương; Đi qua thương nhớ (The Ballad of Nostalgia) by Hà Nhi; Ngông cuồng (Wild) by Đạt G ft. Bùi Dương Thái Hà	Crime, Action, Political, Drama, Romance	Based on Đào Trung Hiếu's novel of the same name. Produced in 2019–2020. Delayed 5 eps on 6 & 29 Apr, 12-13 & 23 May.
8 Jun-15 Jul	Lối nhỏ vào đời (Entrance Into Life)	26	VFC	Nguyễn Đức Hiếu, Lê Đỗ Ngọc Linh (directors); Nguyễn Mạnh Cường, Ánh Phương (writers); Phan Anh, Tạ Hoàng Long, Bùi Bài Bình, Ngọc Thư, Nguyễn Kim Oanh, Quỳnh Lương, Nguyễn Hoàng Ngọc Huyền, Hiệp Đỗ, Lý Chí Huy, Linh Hương, Huyền Sâm, Hằng Nga, Quang Khải, Nguyễn Vũ, Tiến Huy, Tùng Nam, Đỗ Triệu, Lan Hương, Trương Hoàng, Thu Hương, Ngọc Tản, Xuân Thắng...		Coming-of-Age, Drama, Slice-of-Life, Scholastic	Delayed 2 eps on 21 & 30 Jun. Formerly: Tuổi 18 (Years 18)
18 Jul-1 Nov	Đấu trí (Mind Games)	74	VFC	Nguyễn Danh Dũng, Bùi Quốc Việt, Nguyễn Đức Hiếu (directors); Tạ Hồng Minh, Từ Hải Vân, Thành Long, Trương Thùy Linh (writers); Trung Anh, Thanh Sơn, Doãn Quốc Đam, Lương Thu Trang, Vĩnh Xương, Trịnh Mai Nguyên, Anh Tuấn, Hồng Quang, Xuân Phúc, Tô Dũng, Phan Thắng, Anh Đào, Đức Khuê, Nguyễn Thùy Dương, Nguyệt Hằng, Trần Nhượng, Hồ Phong, Tú Oanh, Đặng Tất Bình, Tuấn Anh, Nguyễn Thanh Bình, Thanh Tùng, Trần Đức, Lưu Duy Khánh, Trần Thị Diễm Hương, Chu Quỳnh Chi, Tạ Minh Thảo, Việt Thắng, Nguyễn Hải, Quách Thu Phương, Hoàng Anh Vũ, Đỗ Quỳnh Hoa, Kiều Minh Hiếu, Quốc Trị, Đỗ Kỷ, Ngọc Thoa, Huyền Trang, Minh Hằng, Phú Đôn, Dương Đức Quang, Chí Dương, Thu Huyền, Hoàng Xuân, Xuân Trường, Đào Hoàng Yến, Minh Cúc, Lý Chí Huy, Hồng Liên, Linh Huệ, Việt Bắc, Xuân Hồng, Linh Hương, Nhật Quang, Nguyễn Mạnh Cường, Hoàng Công, Xuân Thông, Tạ Vũ Thu, Trịnh Xuân Hảo, Nông Dũng Nam, Hoàng Huy, Danh Thái, Đặng Tam Thuận, Ngọc Hải, Anh Thơ, Xuân Đồng, Hoàng Khải, Cao Môn, Hoàng Tùng, Hồng Hạnh, Tùng Anh, Thúy An, Phú Kiên, Uy Linh, Mạnh Đạt, Tiến Huy, Thanh Huyền, Trung Cường, Đức Hùng, Mạnh Hùng, Tuấn Giang, Thu Hà, Anh Dũng, Lâm Tùng, Trương Hoàng, Sơn Tùng, Vương Anh, Trần Tài, Xuân Thắng, Nguyễn Tiến Việt, Lâm Hoàng... Cameo: Tự Long		Political, Crime, Drama	Ordered by Ministry of Public Security. Inspired by Việt Á scandal and Nhật Cường Mobile case. Delayed 3 eps on 27 Jul, 14 & 17 Oct.
3 Nov 2022- 11 Jan 2023	Mẹ Rơm (Straw Mother)	43 (30′); Replay: 24 (45′)	VFC	Nguyễn Phương Điền (director); Ngọc Bích, Kim Li Bắc (writers); Thái Hòa, Cao Minh Đạt, Ngọc Lan, Suri Nhã Vy, Huỳnh Hồng Loan, Cao Thái Hà, Minh Luân, Lily Chen, Vũ Ngọc Ánh, Ngân Quỳnh, Trần Thị Thanh Hiền, Tấn Thi, Lê Quốc Tân, Tiêu Anh Tuấn, Hiếu Hiền, Trương Lộc, Tuyền Mập, Ly Na Trang, Thành Khôn, Quang Thuận, Phương Nguyễn, Huỳnh An, Châu Thế Tâm, Đàm Quang Vinh, Phương Ngọc...	Đời mẹ rơm vẫn như thế (Straw Mother's Life Is Still Like That) by Trang Pháp	Drama, Rural, Slice-of-Life	Delayed 7 eps on 18 & 22-23 Nov, 9 & 14 Dec, 20 & 30 Dec. Formerly: Trái tim tỏa nắng (The Shining Heart) The 45' version, consisting of 24 eps, will be broadcast daily at 21:45 from 21 & 31 Dec 2025, 22:20 on 1–2 Jan 2026 and 21:45 from 3 & 19 Jan 2026 on VTV Cần Thơ.

== VTV3 Weeknight Prime-time dramas ==
=== First line-up ===
These dramas air from 20:00 to 20:30, Monday to Friday on VTV3.

From 1 to 21 Sep, the time slot was filled in by the music show Tần số 20 (The Frequency of 20), re-broadcast from VTV6.

From 17 Nov to 16 Dec, the time slot was paused due to the broadcast schedule for an accompanying program with the 2022 FIFA World Cup.

Broadcast	Title	Eps.	Prod.	Cast and crew	Theme song(s)	Genre	Notes
22 Sep-16 Nov; First release: 9 Jul-28 Aug	Sao phải xoắn (Big Deal!)	40; First rls: 16/40	VFC	Phạm Gia Phương, Trần Trọng Khôi (directors); Tiết Kim Oanh, Ngọc Khánh An, Mai Búp, Lại Phương Thảo (writers); Công Dương, Kiều My, Đức Châu, Minh Trà, Bảo Hân, Minh Vượng, Hồ Liên, Rica, Hán Huy Bách, Mạnh Dũng, Hàn Trang, Thu Huyền, Ngọc Dung, Thảo Uyên, Hoàng Long, Tiến Việt...	Vì đời cho ta đâu hơn một lần thanh xuân (Because Life Only Gives Us One Time of Youth) by Nguyễn Đặng Châu Anh ft. T.R.G	Comedy, Youth, Musical	First released as a part of VTV3 show Cuộc sống tươi đẹp (Sat-Sun, 18:30 to 18:55)
19 Dec 2022–6 Mar 2023	Gia đình đại chiến - Mùa 1 (Great War of Family - Season 1)	50	VFC & STV Multimedia	Nguyễn Anh Tuấn (director); STV Team (writers); Thái Sơn, Thu Huyền, Hàn Trang, Lâm Đức Anh, Bùi Hồng Anh, Hoàng Khánh Ly, Thiên Bảo, Minh Phương, Trong Lệ...	Nhà trong phố (A Home in Town) & I Love My Family by Hải Nam	Comedy, Family	Delayed 6 eps on 20 & 23-27 Jan 2023.

=== Second line-up ===
==== Monday-Wednesday dramas ====
These dramas air from 21:40 to 22:30, Monday to Wednesday on VTV3.

Broadcast	Title	Eps.	Prod.	Cast and crew	Theme song(s)	Genre	Notes
7 Feb-30 Mar	Lối về miền hoa (Flowerful Way Back)	24	VFC	Vũ Minh Trí (director); Hân Như, Hà Thu Hà, Trịnh Khánh Hà (writers); Trọng Lân, Anh Đào, Tô Dũng, Mạnh Quân, Lâm Đức Anh, Quỳnh Châu, Hàn Trang, Nguyễn Thanh Bình, Đàm Hằng, Hán Huy Bách, Tuấn Cường, Hồ Phong, Hoàng Tùng, Thùy Liên, Tiến Huy, Nguyễn Thuận, Trúc Quỳnh, Trịnh Huyền, Lê Hà, Hà Lê...	Lối về miền hoa (Flowerful Way Back) by Minh Vương; Câu chuyện tình yêu (Love Story) by Lâm Bảo Ngọc	Youth, Rural, Romance, Comedy, Slice-of-Life	Formerly: Tháng năm rực rỡ sắc màu. (Striking Colorful Time)
4 Apr-3 Aug	Thương ngày nắng về 2 (Cherish the Sunny Day)	54/87	VFC	Bùi Tiến Huy (director); Nguyễn Thu Thủy, Nguyễn Nhiệm, Thùy Dương, Lương Ly, Đỗ Lê (writers); Thanh Quý, Lan Phương, Phan Minh Huyền, Nguyễn Ngọc Huyền, Hồng Đăng, Đình Tú, Doãn Quốc Đam, Minh Hòa, Trung Anh, Lan Hương 'Bông', Tiến Đạt, Bá Anh, Nguyễn Bảo Linh, Phạm Tuấn Phong, Quang Trọng, Đỗ Duy Nam, Trương Thu Hà, Trần Chí Trung, Trần Đức, Minh Khuê, Phú Thăng, Hồ Phong, Thanh Hòa, Thanh Tùng, Lâm Bảo Châu, Tiến Mộc, Lâm Tùng, Lưu Huyền Trang, Lương Thu Hà, Tiến Ngọc, Tạ Vũ Thu, Trịnh Xuân Hảo, Chí Bách... Cameo: Hải Ly	Ước mơ của mẹ (Mother's Dream) by Văn Mai Hương	Family, Drama, Romance, Marriage, Business	Based on K-drama Mother of Mine (KBS 2019) Formerly: Con yêu của mẹ (My Precious)
8 Aug-5 Oct	Gara hạnh phúc (The Garage of Happiness)	27	VFC	Bùi Quốc Việt (director); Lê Huyền, Trịnh Khánh Hà (writers); Quỳnh Kool, Bảo Anh, Duy Hưng, Nguyễn Hoàng Ngọc Huyền, Bình An, Diễm Hương, Viết Liên, Anh Tuấn, Tạ Minh Thảo, Hoàng Huy, Tuấn Cường, Dung Kim, Hoàng Long, Xuân Luyện, Lý Hùng, Mạnh Hoàng, Đặng Công Đại, Anh Dũng, Trương Hoàng, Nguyễn Thanh Bình, Xuân Thắng, Linh Huệ, Quỳnh Lương, Mạnh Đạt, Ngọc Hải... / Quỳnh Anh; Cameo: Doãn Quốc Đam, Da LAB	Bất chấp (Regardless) by WHEE! Chúng ta sau này (Us Later) by T.R.I	Youth, Romance, Drama, Comedy, Crime	Formerly: Năm tháng bên nhau (Years Together)
10 Oct 2022–18 Jan 2023	Hành trình công lý (Journey to Justice)	45	VFC	Nguyễn Mai Hiền (director); Lê Thu Thủy, Đàm Vân Anh, Nguyễn Trung Dũng, Vũ Liêm (writers); Hồng Diễm, Việt Anh, Quốc Huy, Thu Quỳnh, Hà Việt Dũng, Như Quỳnh, Doãn Quốc Đam, Thu Huyền, Minh Hòa, Trọng Trinh, Tiến Lộc, Trung Anh, Đức Hùng, Anh Tuấn, Vũ Hồng Thái, Tân Anh, Phương Hạnh, Huyền Trang, Phú Thăng, Quốc Trị, Đỗ Kỷ, Việt Thắng, Thu Hạnh, Viết Liên, Hoàng Hải, Thùy Liên, Hoàng Công, Nguyễn Kim Oanh, Huỳnh Hồng Loan, Trương Hoàng, Ngô Minh Hoàng, Lương Ngọc Dung, Thanh Hương, Hoàng Du Ka, Trần Vân, Thanh Tú, Bình Xuyên, Hoàng Huy, Xuân Hiền, Công Tuấn, Minh Hà, Mạnh Đạt, Trịnh Huyền, Thu Hương, Phạm Thanh Hòa, Hoàng Tùng, Kim Dung, Trúc Quỳnh, Đậu Hồng Phúc, Minh Thu, Phạm Đình Hưng, Trung Tuấn, Minh Anh, Lê Hà, Dương Khánh, Phương My, Nguyễn Mạnh Hà, Tuấn Anh, Hồng Nhung, Trương Tuyết, Ngô Lệ Quyên...	Nỗi nhớ mùa đông (Winter Nostalgia) by Ngọc Anh	Legal, Drama, Crime, Marriage	A remake of the American TV series The Good Wife (CBS 2009–2016) Formerly: Người vợ tốt (The Good Wife)

==== Thursday-Friday dramas ====
These dramas air from 21:40 to 22:30, Thursday and Friday on VTV3.

Broadcast	Title	Eps.	Prod.	Cast and crew	Theme song(s)	Genre	Notes
13 Jan-22 Apr	Anh có phải đàn ông không? (So You Call Yourself a Man?)	28	VFC	Trịnh Lê Phong (director); Ngô Như Trang, Tiết Kim Oanh, Ngọc Khánh An, Mai Búp (writers); Lại Phương Thảo, Đàm Vân Anh (editors); Nhan Phúc Vinh, Tuấn Tú, Hà Việt Dũng, Thúy An, Việt Hoa, Quỳnh Kool, Thanh Hương, Đan Lê, Kiều Minh Hiếu, Mạnh Cường, Bùi Bài Bình, Trần Hoàng Anh Phương, Bùi Vũ Phong, Phạm Đình Hưng, Phương Hạnh, Hoàng Huy, Trần Hoàng, Tiến Ngọc, Nguyễn Huyền Trang, Đình Chiến, Thanh Hằng, Tô Dũng, Vĩnh Xương, Trúc Quỳnh, Nam Việt, Kim Ngọc, Đỗ Huệ, Minh Phương... / Phúc Minh	Hôm nay anh rất mệt (I'm So Tired Today) by Tuấn Tú, Hà Việt Dũng, Nhan Phúc Vinh	Comedy, Marriage, Romance, Drama	Delayed 2 eps during Tet holiday (on 3-4 Feb). Last 2 eps aired in 2 versions: 45′ on TV, 60′ on vtvgiaitri.
28 Apr-15 Sep	Chồng cũ, vợ cũ, người yêu cũ (Ex-husband, Ex-wife, Ex-lover)	40	VFC	Vũ Trường Khoa, Hoàng Tích Thiện (directors); Trịnh Khánh Hà, Trịnh Đan Phượng, Trịnh Cẩm Hằng, Thu Trang (writers); Việt Anh, Lã Thanh Huyền, Thúy Hằng, Chí Nhân, Ngô Minh Hoàng, Quỳnh Nga, Nguyễn Quỳnh Trang, Thùy Dương, Đức Trung, Công Lý, Vân Dung, Quang Thắng, Trần Việt Hoàng, Thái Dũng, Nguyễn Quỳnh Anh, Trương Hoàng, Hàn Trang, Tố Uyên, Thành Trung...	Sẽ chưa là quá muộn (It Won't Be Too Late) by Bằng Kiều, Phương Phương Thảo ft. Saxophone Lê Duy Mạnh	Drama, Family, Marriage, Romance	Delayed 1 ep on 12 Aug due to special event. Formerly: Về chung một nhà. (Same Home to Come)
16 Sep-25 Nov	Thông gia ngõ hẹp (Unexpected In-Laws)	21	VFC	Trịnh Lê Phong (director); Hà Anh Thu, Nguyễn Mạnh Cường (writers); Trọng Trinh, Chí Trung, Việt Hoa, Trọng Lân, Linh Huệ, Ngọc Thư, Đồng Thu Hà, Tuyết Liên, Lưu Huyền Trang, Phụng Nghi, Phạm Tuấn Phong, Tiến Ngọc... / Lâm Đức Anh, Thiện Hùng, Lê Tuấn Thành, Hòa Rosy		Comedy, Family, Marriage, Drama	Formerly: Vì chúng mình là một gia đình. (Because We Are a Family)
1 Dec 2022–3 Mar 2023	Đừng làm mẹ cáu (Don't Vex a Mom!)	25	VFC	Vũ Minh Trí (director); Nguyễn Thu Thủy, Diệu Thúy (writers); Quỳnh Kool, Nguyễn Ngọc An Nhiên, Nhan Phúc Vinh, Quỳnh Lương, Bình An, Phạm Tuấn Phong, Thanh Tú, Nguyệt Hằng, Nguyễn Thanh Bình, Anh Đức, Hương Giang, Mạnh Quân, Quang Trọng, Hoàng Long, Lê Tuấn Thành, Thân Thương, Thu An, Dương Lan Anh, Hán Huy Bách, Ngô Mai Phương, Lương Ngọc Dung, Phạm Hồng, Thảo Nhi, Trọng Trí, Hoàng Khải, Minh Nguyệt, Thanh Hương...	Đừng làm mẹ cáu (Don't Vex a Mom!) & Con là tình yêu (You are the Love) by Ngọc Anh Thư	Comedy, Romance, Drama, Children	Delayed 3 eps on 20 Jan & 26-27 Jan 2023 due to Tết special shows.

== Non-recurring dramas ==
The drama was released outside of the regular drama time slot. It airs from 8:05 to 8:50, Monday to Friday on VTV1.

Broadcast	Title	Eps.	Prod.	Cast and crew	Theme song(s)	Genre	Notes
6-19 Jul	Bình minh phía trước (Here Comes the Dawn)	10	IDE Media	Bùi Tuấn Dũng (director & writer); Nguyễn Thanh Tuấn, Hoàng Hải, Trần Việt Hoàng, Thục Anh, Vũ Đình Thân, Anh Tuấn, Đỗ Minh Hiếu, Hứa Khải, Nguyễn Văn Thắng, Phương Lan, Nguyễn Huyền Trang, Olivier Waryn, Nguyễn Tiến Đại, Nguyễn Khánh Linh, Lê Tuấn, Lê Khả Sinh...		Biography, Historical, War	Airs on the occasion of 110th anniversary of General Secretary Nguyễn Văn Cừ's birthday

== See also ==
- List of dramas broadcast by Vietnam Television (VTV)
- List of dramas broadcast by Hanoi Radio Television (HanoiTV)
- List of dramas broadcast by Vietnam Digital Television (VTC)
