= List of VTV dramas broadcast in 2018 =

This is a list of VTV dramas released in 2018.

←2017 – 2018 – 2019→

== VTV Special Tet dramas ==
This drama airs from 13:10 to 14:00, 30th to 3rd Tet holiday on VTV1.

Broadcast	Title	Eps.	Prod.	Cast and crew	Theme song(s)	Genre	Notes
15-18 Feb	Con hảo hán, ba không ngán ('Hero' Son with Bold Father)	4	VFC	Hoàng Sơn, Lê Mạnh (directors); Cao Thị Hằng (writer); Lê Bình, Hoàng Sơn, Phương Dung, Quốc Huy, Phương Anh, Khả Như, Lê Hoàng, Lê Trang, Mạc Văn Khoa...		Family, Drama, Rural	a.k.a. Con hảo hán, tía không ngán

== VTV1 Weeknight Prime-time dramas ==
- Note: Starting 26 Nov, this time slot becomes a new time frame produced by VFC.

=== Monday-Wednesday dramas ===
These dramas air from 20:45 to 21:35, Monday to Wednesday on VTV1.

Broadcast	Title	Eps.	Prod.	Cast and crew	Theme song(s)	Genre	Notes
22 Jan-2 May	Đánh tráo số phận (Switch of Fate)	34	Phuong Sang Film	Trần Chí Thành (director); Châu Ngọc (writer); Nhung Kate, Trương Nam Thành, Như Yến, Kim Phượng, Lý Anh Tuấn, Lan Phương...	Tìm lại yêu thương (Finding Love Again); Trở về (Coming Back) by Trần Phương Mai	Drama, Crime, Action	Produced in 2016.
7 May-28 Aug	Mỹ nhân Sài thành (The Beauties of Saigon)	49	VTV and Cat Tien Sa	Lê Cung Bắc (director); Đinh Thiên Phúc (writer); Ngân Khánh, Khánh My, Dương Mỹ Linh, Lý Hùng, Lê Bình, Huỳnh Đông, Thành Được, Đình Hiếu, Toronto Thành, Bryan David, Mai Sơn Lâm, Bích Hằng, Quốc Tân...	Tình phù du (Fleeting Love) by Cẩm Vân	Drama, Period	Produced in 2014.
29 Aug-23 Nov	Trang trại hoa hồng (Roses Farm)	35	VTV and Ceco Film	Dương Nam Quan (director); Nguyễn Thiên Vỹ (writer); Đoàn Thanh Tài, Ngọc Lan, Quốc Huy, Tú Vi, Kiến An, Hứa Minh Đạt, Ngọc Hùng, Băng Khuê, Nam Thư, Minh Cường, Thanh Tuấn, Bích Hằng...	Mơ hoa hồng (Dream of Roses) by Uyên Linh	Drama	The last drama & also last socialized drama fully airing on this time slot. Produced on 2014.

=== Thursday-Friday dramas ===
These dramas air from 20:45 to 21:35, Thursday and Friday on VTV1.

Broadcast	Title	Eps.	Prod.	Cast and crew	Theme song(s)	Genre	Notes
25 Jan-14 Jun	Tình khúc bạch dương (Love Stories in the Land of Birch)	36	VFC	Vũ Trường Khoa (director); Đặng Diệu Hương, Phạm Kim Ngân, Nguyễn Hải Anh (writers); Thanh Mai, Chi Bảo, Lê Vũ Long, Hoa Thúy, Công Lý, Kiều Anh, Bình An, Huỳnh Anh, Nhã Phương, Minh Trang, Quang Tuấn, Huỳnh Hồng Loan, Phan Minh Huyền, Trọng Trinh, Quỳnh Kool...	Mãi chỉ là giấc mơ (It's Just A Dream Forever) by Tùng Dương	Drama, Romance, Marriage	Adapted from the novel of "Tình khúc Lavanda" by FBNK
12 Jul–16 Nov	Hạnh phúc không có ở cuối con đường (No Happiness at the End of the Road)	33	VTV and Khải Hưng Film	Nguyễn Khải Hưng (director); Đỗ Trí Hùng (writer); Thùy Dương, Hồng Quang, Kiều Thanh, Diệu Thuần, Trần Chí Trung, Hương Dung, Trần Đức, Khuất Quỳnh Hoa...	Hạnh phúc chỉ vậy thôi (Happiness Is That Simple) by Hoàng Quyên	Drama, Marriage	Preceded by 'Quỳnh búp bê' 's first 6eps. The last drama on this time slot. Produced in 2014.

- Note: Since Hạnh phúc không có ở cuối con đường ended one week sooner than Trạng trại hoa hồng, last 5 episodes of the latter drama aired Monday to Friday. After that, two haft of the time slot was merged to make it air only one drama a week. New drama Kẻ ngược dòng by VFC aired next but stopped after episode 4 in VTV's plan to adjust the time slot. It was replaced by the playback of Làn môi trong mưa (2012) before the time slot's duration was officially reduced from 45 minutes down to 30 minutes in the following year.

== VTV3 Weeknight Prime-time dramas ==
=== First line-up ===
These dramas air from 20:00 to 20:30, Monday to Thursday on VTV3.

Broadcast	Title	Eps.	Prod.	Cast and crew	Theme song(s)	Genre	Notes
1 Jan–1 Nov	Xin chào hạnh phúc – Mùa 2 (Hello Happiness – Season 2)	Ep 101 to Ep 271	VTV and VietCom Film	Nguyễn Bảo Trâm (executive producer); Various Artists		Drama	A series comprises numerous short miniseries
5 Nov 2018– 15 Jan 2019	Mẹ ơi, bố đâu rồi? (Mom, where is Dad?)	42	VFC	Bùi Tiến Huy (director); Đỗ Trí Hùng, Lê Huyền (writers); Lê Khanh, Hoàng Sơn, Diễm Hằng, Quỳnh Kool, Lê Na, Quang Thắng, Vinh Kiên, Mạnh Quân, Nguyễn Tuấn Anh, Đức Khuê... Cameo: Lan Phương, Thanh Sơn, Jimmii Khánh, Quang Minh, Lê Mai, Minh Vượng...		Family, Comedy	Based on American series Last Man Standing (FOX 2011)

=== Second line-up ===
==== Monday-Tuesday dramas ====
These dramas air from 21:40 to 22:30, Monday and Tuesday on VTV3.

- Note: Starting from 11 Jun, the movie Ngày ấy mình đã yêu has aired and becomes a new time frame produced by VFC.

Broadcast	Title	Eps.	Prod.	Cast and crew	Theme song(s)	Genre	Notes
29 Jan–5 Jun	Mộng phù hoa (Sumptuous Dream)	36	Khang Viet Film	Quế Ngọc, Nam Yên (directors); Nguyễn Chương (writer); Kim Tuyến, Thân Thúy Hà, Tường Vi, Hà Việt Dũng, Quốc Trường, Hoàng Anh, Võ Hiệp, Yến Nhi...	Kiếp xuân muộn (Lifetime as Late Spring) by Nguyên Hà	Drama, Old-fashioned	The last socialized drama airing on this time slot. Formerly: Người đàn bà quyến rũ (Temptress)
11 Jun–28 Aug	Ngày ấy mình đã yêu (Those Days We Fell In Love)	24	VFC	Nguyễn Khải Anh, Quang Vinh (directors); Nguyễn Thu Thủy, Thu Trang (writers); Nhã Phương, Lương Thế Thành, Nhan Phúc Vinh, Bảo Thanh, Chí Thiện, Xuân Nghị, Tam Triều Dâng, Hoàng Sơn, Ngân Quỳnh, Phương Dung, Anh Tài, Đan Lê, Andrea Aybar, Văn Anh... / Cameo: Hoàng Thùy Linh	Only You by Elvis Presley Gọi (Call); Poem by Hữu Việt; Music by Xuân Phương; Recited by Nhã Phương	Romance, Drama	Based on Korean drama Discovery of Love (KBS 2014) Formerly: Tình yêu tìm thấy (Found Love)
15 Jun–6 Jul (VTV1); 3 Sep-20 Nov (VTV3); Extra Story: 21 Nov (on vtvgiaitri)	Quỳnh búp bê (Quỳnh the Doll)	28+1; Esp 1-6: VTV1; Esp 7-28: VTV3	VFC	Mai Hồng Phong (director); Phạm Kim Ngân, Đặng Minh Châu, Mai Việt, Nguyễn Thu Thủy (writers); Phương Oanh, Nguyễn Hải, Thu Quỳnh, Doãn Quốc Đam, Thanh Hương, Minh Tiệp, Trọng Lân, Tuấn Anh, Hải Hà, Hải Anh, Quỳnh Kool, Mạnh Quân, Đồng Thanh Bình, Hồng Liên, Cao Diệp Anh, Thu Huyền, Thu Trang, Phi Yến, Diệp Anh, Duy Hưng, Trương Hoàng... Extra Story: Hà Hương (cameo)		Drama, Crime	Stopped after 6eps on VTV1 due to negative feedback about sensitive scenes. Delay 2 eps (24-25 Sep) during National Mourning. Based on a true story.
26 Nov 2018– 2 Apr 2019	Chạy trốn thanh xuân (Run Away From Youth)	36	VFC	Vũ Minh Trí, Nguyễn Đức Hiếu (directors); Nguyễn Thu Thủy, Mai Diệp (writers); Lưu Đê Ly, Huỳnh Anh, Mạnh Trường, Phan Minh Huyền, Chiều Xuân, Hoàng Hải, Hoa Thúy, Thanh Tú, Bình An, Phạm Ngọc Anh, Đỗ Hiệp, Thạch Thu Huyền, Lâm Đức Anh, Thùy Dương, Nguyễn Ngọc Anh...		Drama, Romance, Youth, Crime	Formerly: Oan gia xóm trọ (Boarding House of Accidental Enemies)

==== Wednesday–Thursday dramas ====
These dramas air from 21:50 to 22:40, Wednesday and Thursday on VTV3.

Broadcast	Title	Eps.	Prod.	Cast and crew	Theme song(s)	Genre	Notes
29 Aug-13 Dec	Yêu thì ghét thôi (I Hate You Because I Love You)	30	VFC	Trịnh Lê Phong (director); Lê Huyền (writer); Đình Tú, Lê Phương Anh, Vân Dung, Chí Trung, Quang Thắng, Ngọc Dũng, Hoàng Thu Trang, Hồng Hạnh, Hải Anh, Đỗ Duy Nam, Anh Dũng, Mạnh Hưng, Vũ Thu Hoài, Lương Thanh... Cameo: Thu Quỳnh, Lương Giang, Hương Giang	Yêu thì ghét thôi (I Hate You Because I Love You) by Hồng Phi; Có những ngày (There Are The Days) by Hồng Nhung & Thu Trang	Drama, Comedy	a.k.a. Ghét thì yêu thôi 2 (I Love You Because I Hate You 2)
19 Dec 2018– 18 Apr 2019	Những cô gái trong thành phố (Girls in the city)	34	VFC	Vũ Trường Khoa (director); Đặng Tất Bình, Lê Anh Thúy (writers); Lương Thu Trang, Nguyễn Kim Oanh, Hoàng Mai Anh, Lương Thanh, Công Lý, Thúy An, Viết Thái, Thu Huyền, Chí Nhân, Thúy Hà, Bình An, Mạnh Dũng, Ngọc Tản, Anh Thơ, Hằng Nga, Sùng Lãm, Ngọc Crystal Eyes, Trần Nhượng, Hà Anh, Hồng Nhung, Hồng Liên...	Giấc mơ muộn màng (Belated Dream) by Bằng Kiều Cơn mưa ngang qua (Rain Across) by Khánh Linh	Drama	Formerly: Cơn mưa ngang qua (Rain Across)

== VTV3 Weekend Afternoon dramas ==
Starting in 2018, no more dramas in Rubic 8 time slot. New time slot was opened as a collaboration of VTV and MegaGS.

These dramas air from 14:00 to 14:50, Saturday and Sunday on VTV3.

Broadcast	Title	Eps.	Prod.	Cast and crew	Theme song(s)	Genre	Notes
10 Mar–15 Jul	Nếu còn có ngày mai (If Ever There's Tomorrow)	38	MegaGS	Hoàng Tuấn Cường (director); Nguyễn Thị Mộng Thu (writer); Bella Mai, Sam, Quang Tuấn, Quốc Trường, Thân Thúy Hà, Quốc Cường, Yến Nhi, Hạnh Thúy, Thanh Hằng, Quang Khải, Mai Bảo Ngọc, Lê Bình...	Con ghẻ (Stepchild) by Nhật Kim Anh	Drama	Moved out of Rubic8 time slot after Thương nhớ ở ai.
21 Jul-30 Dec	Cung đường tội lỗi (The Way of Sins)	46	MegaGS	Hoàng Tuấn Cường (director); Nguyễn Thị Mỹ Hà, Ngọc Thuận (writers); Xuân Văn, Hồ Giang Bảo Sơn, Trương Nam Thành, Huỳnh Hồng Loan, Kim Xuân, Thư Nguyễn, Mỹ Dung, Lê Khâm, Đức Sơn, Thân Thúy Hà, Quốc Trường, Bella Mai, Trọng Nhân, Huỳnh Anh Tuấn, Hải Băng, Ngọc Trai, Mỹ Uyên, Võ Hiệp...		Drama	Produced in 2016.

== Non-recurring dramas ==
These dramas were warehoused and now released on VTV channels in the time slot that's originally made for playback dramas.

Broadcast	Title	Eps.	Prod.	Cast and crew	Theme song(s)	Genre	Notes
20 Aug-20 Nov	Cõi mộng (Dreamland)	40	VTV & LEO Media	Võ Việt Hùng, Nguyễn Tấn Phước (directors); Đặng Thanh (writer); Thanh Điền, Mỹ Uyên, Hà Trí Quang, Hoài Trang, Quang Tuyến, Quốc Huy, Anh Tú, Thiên Kim, Thùy Trang, Phương Ngân, Thạch Kim Long, La Ngọc Duy, Bích Hằng, Ngọc Hạnh, Mai Trần, Trần Kim Lợi, Như Yến, Quang Minh, Ngọc Hậu, Thùy Linh, Phương Thảo, Phương Minh, Minh Hảo, Diễm Trinh...	Vẫn như lúc đầu (Still Like The Beginning) by Châu Đăng Khoa	Drama, Musical	Airs from 21:10-22:00, Mon to Wed on VTV8. Preceded by a foreign drama. Delay 1 ep on 11 Sep due to special event. Produced in 2014.
19 Nov-21 Dec	Định mệnh trùng phùng (Coincidental Fate)	33	Thiên Nam An	Đặng Minh Quang (director); Đặng Thu Thảo, Huỳnh Đông, Trung Dũng, Khánh Huyền, Thành Đạt, Lâm Hải Sơn, Mỹ Dung, Sỹ Toàn, Ngọc Hùng, Bùi Văn Hải, Nguyễn Hậu, Quốc Tân...		Drama	Airs from 12:00-12:45 on VTV8. Produced in 2014.
21 Nov–31 Dec (stopped)	Dạ khúc nguyệt cầm (The Moon Lute Serenade)	17/30	VTV & LEO Media	Vương Quang Hùng (director); Phan Ngọc Liên (writer); Việt Hương, Hòa Hiệp, Đông Dương, Kim Hiền, Ngọc Lan, Quốc Bảo, Hoàng Mập, Tuyết Trinh, Hồng Nhung, Kiều Linh, Mai Sơn, Thái Chí Hùng, Phi Phụng, Thanh Ngọc, Hoài Ân, Lê Trung, Tăng Du Hạo, Duy England, Hồng Anh, Quang Minh, Nguyễn Đoàn, Như Ý, Thanh Vy, Minh Thông, Đình Hiếu...	Đời như ý (Life Goes Well) by Đông Dương	Drama, Musical	Airs from 21:10-22:00, Mon to Wed on VTV8. Adapted from short story of 'Đời như ý' by Nguyễn Ngọc Tư. Stopped due to reschedule broadcast, fully aired later on VTV. Produced in 2015.

== See also ==
- List of dramas broadcast by Vietnam Television (VTV)
- List of dramas broadcast by Hanoi Radio Television (HanoiTV)
- List of dramas broadcast by Vietnam Digital Television (VTC)
