= List of VTV dramas broadcast in 2021 =

This is a list of VTV dramas released in 2021.

←2020 - 2021 - 2022→

== VTV Special Tet dramas ==
This drama airs in prime time from 1st to 4th lunar-new-year days on VTV1.

Episodes 1 & 2 air from 22:00 to 22:50 and 21:10 to 22:00, respectively. Episodes 3 & 4 air from 21:40 to 22:30.

Broadcast	Title	Eps.	Prod.	Cast and crew	Theme song(s)	Genre	Notes
12-15 Feb; Special Edition: 14 Mar; Re-release: 5–15 Mar 2024 (VTV1)	Yêu hơn cả bầu trời (Sky-high Love)	4 (45′); Special Ed.: 1 (130′)	VFC	Nguyễn Khải Anh, Phạm Gia Phương (directors); Trịnh Khánh Hà, Nguyễn Thu Thủy (writers); Thanh Sơn, Bình An, Mạnh Quân, Quang Sự, Ngô Mai Phương, Chiều Xuân, Thanh Dương, Thiện Tùng, Huyền Sâm, Thiện Huy, Ngọc Tú...		Youth, Action, Drama, Scholastic	Special Ed. airs 20:35-22:45, Sunday on VTV1 as a TV Movie. Based on a true story. Formerly: Chung một bầu trời (The Sky We Share)

== VTV1 Weeknight Prime-time dramas ==
These dramas air from 21:00 to 21:30, Monday to Friday on VTV1.

- Note: From 28 Oct to 5 Nov, the time slot was followed by 2017 Tet drama Mátxcơva - Mùa thay lá re-release version (adjusted from 4 original episodes to 7 episodes).

Broadcast	Title	Eps.	Prod.	Cast and crew	Theme song(s)	Genre	Notes
19 Apr-27 Oct	Hương vị tình thân (The Taste of Intimacy)	136; Pt.1: 71e Pt.2: 65e	VFC	Nguyễn Danh Dũng (director); Trịnh Khánh Hà, Trịnh Cẩm Hằng, Trịnh Đan Phượng (writers); Phương Oanh, Mạnh Trường, Thu Quỳnh, Võ Hoài Nam, Quách Thu Phương, Tú Oanh, Trịnh Mai Nguyên, Như Quỳnh, Hoàng Anh Vũ, Thu Hạnh, Công Lý, Sỹ Hưng, Ánh Tuyết/Bích Ngọc, Tô Dũng, Hồ Phong, Việt Bắc, Sơn Tùng, Minh Cúc, Anh Tuấn, Bùi Bài Bình, Linh Huệ, Xuân Hiền, Mạnh Đạt, Nguyễn Quỳnh Trang, Việt Hoa, Phùng Khánh Linh, Đào Hoàng Yến, Nam Anh, Thục Anh, Thiên Hoa, Minh Nguyệt, Jimmii Khánh, Trương Hoàng, Danh Thái, Phương Thanh, Lý Chí Huy, Nông Dũng Nam, Hoàng Công... / Doãn Quốc Đam, Đỗ Duy Nam, Linh Hương, Vũ Hải, Thùy Linh, Nguyễn Hà Anh, Phụng Nghi, Nguyễn Ngọc An Nhiên, Xuân Thắng, Minh Thu...	Hương tình thân (The Scent of Intimacy) by Lâm Bảo Ngọc Sẽ mãi một tình yêu (Love Forever) by Minh Vương	Family, Drama, Romance, Business, Crime	Based on K-drama My Only One (KBS 2018-2019). Delayed 2 eps on 20 Apr and 2 Sep.
8 Nov 2021– 18 Feb 2022	Phố trong làng (Street in the Village)	58	VFC	Nguyễn Mai Hiền, Trần Trọng Khôi (directors); Đặng Diệu Hương, Lê Thu Thủy, Nguyễn Mạnh Cường (writers); Phạm Anh Tuấn, Phạm Ngọc Anh, Phùng Đức Hiếu, Lưu Duy Khánh, Đức Khuê, Đình Chiến, Ngô Lệ Quyên, Doãn Quốc Đam, Duy Hưng, Trần Vân, Tuấn Anh, Thu Huyền, Vĩnh Xương, Việt Thắng, Bình Xuyên, Tiến Mộc, Ngọc Thư, Mạnh Đạt, Minh Thu, Xuân Thông, Tạ Vũ Thu, Thùy Liên, Hoàng Triều Dương, Trọng Minh, Anh Tuấn, Thu Hương, Nhật Linh, Tuấn Cường, Dương Đức Quang, Ngọc Tản, Quốc Trị, Đào Thúy Hường, Danh Thái, Kim Dung, Minh Nguyệt, Phí Thùy Linh, Trọng Nguyên...		Rural, Romance, Political, Crime, Drama	Delayed 9 eps on 18 Nov, 2 Dec, 20-21 & 31 Jan and 1-4 Feb. Temporarily replaced by Mùa xuân ở lại (8 eps ver.) from 3 to 12 Jan.

== VTV3 Weeknight Prime-time dramas ==
=== First line-up ===
These dramas air from 20:00 to 20:30 (20:00 to 20:25 from Nov 15), Monday to Friday on VTV3.

After the end of Xin chào hạnh phúc (season 4) on 30 Jul, the production for this time slot was disrupted due to COVID-19 quarantine. It was filled in by several shows before the rerun. The shows are respectively: Bố ơi! Mình đi đâu thế? (season 1, rebroadcast), Ngày xưa CHILL phết (from VTV6) and Trạng nguyên nhí (rebroadcast).

Notes:
- Aired at 21:00 on 26 Jan and 20:30 on 1 Feb because the runtime of the 19:00 News Report was extended for news on the 13th national congress of the ruling Communist Party of Vietnam
- Delayed 1 episode on Friday, 2 Apr due to the 25 Years of VTV3 celebration program

Broadcast	Title	Eps.	Prod.	Cast and crew	Theme song(s)	Genre	Notes
1 Nov 2021– 1 Jul 2022	Xin chào hạnh phúc - Mùa 5 (Hello Happiness - Season 5)	Ep 875 to Ep 1034	VTV and VietCom Film	Nguyễn Bảo Trâm (executive producer); Various Artists		Drama	A series comprises numerous short miniseries.

=== Second line-up ===
==== Monday-Wednesday dramas ====
These dramas air from 21:30 to 22:20 (21:40 to 22:30 from Jun 7), Monday to Wednesday on VTV3.

Broadcast	Title	Eps.	Prod.	Cast and crew	Theme song(s)	Genre	Notes
25 May-27 Jul; Extra parody: 5 Jul (on vtvgiaitri)	Mùa hoa tìm lại (Rebloom)	28	VFC	Vũ Minh Trí (director); Lê Huyền (writer); Thanh Hương, Hương Giang, Duy Hưng, Duy Khoa, Mạnh Hưng, Vũ Thu Hoài, Thạch Thu Huyền, Lâm Đức Anh, Đức Khuê, Ngọc Tản, Thanh Dương, Hồ Liên, Tùng Anh, Thanh Hiền, Phú Thăng, Phương Hạnh, Hán Huy Bách, Phụng Nghi, Lê Linh Hương, Hải Ly, Anh Đức, Việt Bắc, Thùy Liên, Quốc Trị, Tuấn Cường, Thiện Huy, Hoàng Huy...	Mùa hoa tìm lại (Rebloom) & Câu chuyện tình yêu (Love Story) by Lâm Bảo Ngọc	Rural, Drama, Romance, Family, Comedy	The extra parody only lasted 9 minutes
28 Jul-10 Nov	11 tháng 5 ngày (11 Months and 5 Days)	46	VFC	Nguyễn Đức Hiếu, Lê Đỗ Ngọc Linh (directors); Lại Phương Thảo, Diệu Linh, Vy Trần (writers); Khả Ngân, Thanh Sơn, Hà Trung, Lương Thanh, Vân Dung, Quang Thắng, Anh Thơ, Phan Ngọc Lan, Mạnh Cường, Minh Hương, Tuấn Tú, Tiến Lộc, Bình An, Nguyễn Huyền Trang, Phú Thăng, Phương Hạnh, Ngọc Tản, Trần Cường, Đức Quảng, Phạm Tuấn Anh, Quốc Trị, Yến Hoàn, Quang Lâm, Thiên Hoa, Phạm Ngọc Anh, Phùng Thu Huyền... / Huyền Sâm, Nguyễn Hà Anh; Cameo: Bùi Phương Nga, Lưu Mạnh Dũng	Gác lại âu lo (Put Worries Aside) by Da LAB ft. Miu Lê 11 tháng 5 ngày (11 Months and 5 Days) by Nguyễn Đặng Châu Anh ft. Minh Tốc & Lam	Romance, Comedy, Drama, Slice-of-Life, Youth	Formerly: Điều em chưa biết (What You Didn't Know)
15 Nov 2021– 26 Jan 2022	Thương ngày nắng về (Cherish the Sunny Day)	33/87	VFC	Bùi Tiến Huy, Vũ Trường Khoa (directors); Nguyễn Thu Thủy, Nguyễn Nhiệm, Thùy Dương, Lương Ly, Đỗ Lê (writers); Thanh Quý, Lan Phương, Phan Minh Huyền, Nguyễn Ngọc Huyền, Hồng Đăng, Đình Tú, Doãn Quốc Đam, Minh Hòa, Bá Anh, Trung Anh, Lan Hương 'Bông', Nguyễn Bảo Linh, Phạm Tuấn Phong, Tiến Đạt, Trần Đức, Phú Thăng, Quang Trọng, Đỗ Duy Nam, Nguyễn Trang, Phí Thùy Linh, Anna Linh, Ngô Sỹ Lâm, Thanh Tùng, Thanh Hòa, Tiến Mộc... / Lương Ngọc Dung, Thế Nguyên, Nguyễn Kim Oanh, Hồng Nhung, Chu Diệp Anh, Chu Quỳnh Chi, Minh Phương, Thanh Hiền, Hương Dung, Trúc Quỳnh, Việt Bắc, Thái Dương, Phương Lâm, Trần Hoàng, Trọng Minh, Xuân Hồng, Linh Hương... Cameo: Phạm Công Tố, Ngô Mai Phương, Cao Minh Tiến	Ước mơ của mẹ (Mother's Dream) by Văn Mai Hương	Family, Drama, Romance, Marriage, Business	Based on K-drama Mother of Mine (KBS 2019) Formerly: Con yêu của mẹ (My Precious)

==== Thursday-Friday dramas ====
These dramas air from 21:30 to 22:20 (21:40 to 22:30 from Jun 10), Thursday and Friday on VTV3.

Broadcast	Title	Eps.	Prod.	Cast and crew	Theme song(s)	Genre	Notes
15 Apr-6 Aug	Hãy nói lời yêu (Let Us Say Love)	34	VFC	Bùi Quốc Việt (director); Lê Huyền (writer); Nguyệt Hằng, Trọng Trinh, Quỳnh Kool, Công Dương, Trúc Mai, Quang Anh, Bảo Hân, Hoàng Anh Vũ, Hà Việt Dũng, Đỗ Hiệp, Linh Huệ, Thanh Tú, Thúy Phương, Tuấn Cường, Hồng Liên, Xuân Hồng, Ngô Minh Hoàng, Nguyễn Tuấn, Lưu Duy Khánh, Trúc Quỳnh, Nguyễn Huy...	Nếu một ngày... (If One Day...) by Nguyễn Ngọc Anh	Family, Marriage, Psycholo-gical, Drama	Formerly: Hẹn em ngày nắng. (See You on a Sunny Day)
12 Aug-8 Oct	Ngày mai bình yên (Peaceful Morrow)	18	VFC	Vũ Trường Khoa, Hoàng Tích Thiện (directors); Lại Phương Thảo, Diệu Linh, Phượng Diễm (writers); Trung Hiếu, Thúy Hà, Kiều Anh, Kiều My, Tố Uyên, Quang Trọng, Lan Hương 'Bông', Quốc Trị, Tiến Minh, Chí Nhân, Đỗ Duy Nam, Vũ Thắng, Đình Huy, Nguyễn Văn Lục, Huỳnh Đức, Hồng Phong, Tiến Ngọc...	Phía sau cánh cửa (Behind the Door) by Hương Ly & Tiến Minh	Family, Drama, Propa-ganda	Specially produced in/for the COVID-19 quarantine
14 Oct 2021– 7 Jan 2022	Cảnh sát hình sự: Mặt nạ gương (Criminal Police: Mirror Mask)	26	VFC	Bùi Quốc Việt (director); Vũ Liêm (writer); Hoàng Hải, Lương Thu Trang, Ngọc Lan, Bảo Anh, Bình An, Ngọc Quỳnh, Nguyễn Hoàng Ngọc Huyền, Đặng Tất Bình, Thanh Thanh Hiền, Trần Đức, Tạ Tuấn Minh, Xuân Trường, Chí Dương, Lưu Duy Khánh, Huyền Trang, Lưu Huyền Trang, Mạnh Đạt, Xuân Hồng, Xuân Thông, Thu Hương, Huyền Sâm, Lương Ngọc Dung, Nguyễn Quỳnh Trang, Văn Bích...	Mặt nạ gương (Mirror Mask) by Lâm Bảo Ngọc	Crime, Drama, Mystery, Thriller, Medical	Formerly: Bí mật sau khung cửa (Secret Behind the Door)

== VTV3 Weekend Afternoon dramas ==
These dramas air from 14:00 to 14:50, Saturday and Sunday on VTV3.

Broadcast	Title	Eps.	Prod.	Cast and crew	Theme song(s)	Genre	Notes
2 May-18 Sep	Thương con cá rô đồng (Mercy on the Anabas)	40	MegaGS & Phúc Hưng Idea Co.	Hoàng Tuấn Cường (director); Ngọc Bích, La Nguyễn Quốc Vinh (writers); Lê Phương, Quốc Huy, Huỳnh Như Đan, Quang Thái, Hoàng Yến, Hạnh Thúy, Thanh Thức, Ngân Quỳnh, Thành Được, Tuấn Anh, Hoàng Trinh, Đình Hiếu, Đinh Hữu Tài, Phi Điểu, Trang Tuyền, Thanh Ngọc, Cao Phương Thúy, Thư Nguyễn, Lê Mạnh Phương, Ngọc Tuyền, Hải Lý...	Thương con cá rô đồng (Mercy on the Anabas) by Lê Phương	Family, Drama	

== See also ==
- List of dramas broadcast by Vietnam Television (VTV)
- List of dramas broadcast by Hanoi Radio Television (HanoiTV)
- List of dramas broadcast by Vietnam Digital Television (VTC)
