= List of VTV dramas broadcast in 2020 =

This is a list of VTV dramas released in 2020.

←2019 - 2020 - 2021→

== VTV Special Tet dramas ==
This drama airs from 21:40 to 22:30, 1st to 4th lunar-new-year days on VTV1. Re-release versions airs on the same channel in Weeknight Prime-time slot.

Broadcast	Title	Eps.	Prod.	Cast and crew	Theme song(s)	Genre	Notes
25–28 Jan; Re-release: 1st: 23 Mar-3 Apr 2020; 2nd: 3-12 Jan 2022	Mùa xuân ở lại (That Spring Lingers)	4 (45′); Re-rls: 1st: 10 (25′); 2nd: 8 (25′)	VFC	Nguyễn Danh Dũng (director); Thu Thủy, Khánh Hà (writers); Lương Thu Trang, Huỳnh Anh, Tô Dũng, Khuất Quỳnh Hoa, Bảo Anh, Lan Hương 'Bông', Mạnh Đạt, Thanh Dương, Thanh Hoa, Phạm Ngọc Anh, Hoàng Lan, Chí Bảo, Bùi Vũ Phong, Hoàng Du Ka, Nguyễn Thùy Trang...		Drama, Romance, Ethnic	Re-rls versions have new ending footages.

== VTV1 Weeknight Prime-time dramas ==
These dramas air from 21:00 to 21:30, Monday to Friday on VTV1.

Broadcast	Title	Eps.	Prod.	Cast and crew	Theme song(s)	Genre	Notes
6 Apr–16 Jun	Những ngày không quên (Unforgettable Days); Sequel/Crossover of: Về nhà đi con (Come Home, My Dear); Cô gái nhà người ta (A Girl Somewhere); Hoa hồng trên ngực trái (Roses on the Left Chest)	50	VFC	Nguyễn Danh Dũng, Trịnh Lê Phong (directors); Nguyễn Thu Thủy, Trịnh Khánh Hà (writers); Trung Anh, Bùi Bài Bình, Tiến Quang, Thu Quỳnh, Bảo Thanh, Đình Tú, Phương Oanh, Bảo Hân, Tuấn Tú, Thanh Hương, Hương Giang, Việt Bắc, Việt Hoa, Hoàng Du Ka, Hồng Đăng, Hồng Diễm, Linh Huệ, Quang Anh, Quốc Trường, Vân Dung, Hoàng Anh Vũ, Anh Tuấn, Minh Tiệp, Hoàng Dũng, Đào Hoàng Yến, Phùng Khánh Linh, Tiến Lộc, Kim Ngọc, Đỗ Quỳnh Hoa, Hoàng Huy, Nguyễn Hoàng Ngọc Huyền...	Ghen Cô Vy (Jealous Coronavirus) by Min & Erik	Drama, Family, Propa-ganda	Special crossover project during the COVID-19 pandemic. Eps 19 & 20 aired 21:40-22:10 and 21:30-22:00 on 30 Apr & 1 May respectively. Delayed 2 eps on 13 & 18 May.
17 Jun-30 Sep	Lựa chọn số phận (Life Choice)	72	VFC	Mai Hồng Phong, Bùi Quốc Việt (directors); Đặng Minh Châu (writer); Hà Việt Dũng, Phương Oanh, Huỳnh Anh, Mạnh Cường, Thanh Quý, Hoa Thúy, Phú Thăng, Tuấn Tú, Huỳnh Hồng Loan, Văn Báu, Hữu Mười, An Chinh, Tuấn Anh, Hoàng Thanh Du, Tiến Lộc, Dương Đức Quang, Thanh Vân Hugo, Hoàng Hải Thu, Phí Thùy Linh, Xuân Hồng... Case 1: Khuất Quỳnh Hoa, Vũ Phan Anh, Minh Phương, Hồng Liên / Case 2: Nguyễn Đức Trung, Chử Phương Thúy, Nguyễn Thị Nguyệt / Case 3: Trần Đức, Uy Linh, Thanh Tùng, Tùng Linh, Thanh Hòa, Quế Hằng, Trần Nhượng, Trương Thu Hà / Case 4: Bình Xuyên, Thanh Hương, Nông Dũng Nam, Đồng Thanh Bình, Trần Vân		Legal, Drama, Romance, Crime	Ordered by People's Supreme Court. Delayed 4 eps on 22 & 29 Jul, 1 & 2 Sep. Formerly: Người nối nghiệp (The Successor)
1 Oct-15 Dec	Lửa ấm (Cozy Fire)	52	VFC	Đào Duy Phúc (director); Hà Anh Thu, Phạm Phương Thảo, Đặng Thu Hà, Tống Phương Dung (writers); Bành Mai Phương (editor); Trương Minh Quốc Thái, Thúy Hằng, Thu Quỳnh, Tô Dũng, Mạnh Quân, Kim Ngọc, Nguyễn Kim Oanh, Lan Hương 'Bông', Trọng Trinh, Nguyễn Tiến Quang, Hằng Nga, Tiến Lộc, Trần Việt Hoàng, Phạm Ngọc Anh, Nguyễn Ngọc Anh, Việt Hoa...	Lửa ấm (Cozy Fire) by Thu Thủy & Minh Quân Lính cứu hỏa (Firefighter) by Zangta & the cast	Action, Medical, Marriage, Drama	Delayed 2 eps on 1 & 9 Dec.
16 Dec 2020- 16 Apr 2021	Trở về giữa yêu thương (Retire Into Love)	76; Pt.1: 37e Pt.2: 39e	VFC	Trịnh Lê Phong (director); Đặng Tất Bình (idea); Nguyễn Thu Trang, Hoàng Hồng Hạnh, Nguyễn Mạnh Cường (writers); Hoàng Dũng/Trung Anh, Việt Hoa, Phạm Anh Tuấn, Hoa Thúy, Bá Anh, Minh Vượng, Minh Phương, Minh Hằng/Thanh Tú, Phú Thăng, Phú Đôn, Phương Hạnh, Thùy Liên, An Ninh, Lan Anh, Nguyễn Ngọc Huyền, Đăng Dũng, Hoàng Du Ka, Nguyễn Lộc, Trọng Trí, Lý Chí Huy, Hoàng Huy, Hồng Hạnh, Hồng Quang, Diễm Hương, Nhật Quang, Anh Đào, Lưu Duy Khánh, Phan Thắng...	Ngày mai yêu thương quay về (Till Love Comes Again) by Phạm Anh Tuấn	Family, Drama, Slice-of-Life	VTV shortened ep1 5 mins, aired ep11 30 mins earlier on 31 Dec and delayed 11 eps on 30 Dec, 1 Jan, 8 & 13 Jan, 3-4 Feb, 10-12 & 15-16 Feb. Plot and lead actor changed after P.A Hoàng Dũng's death. Formerly: Ai rồi cũng già (Everybody Gets Older)

== VTV3 Weeknight Prime-time dramas ==
=== First line-up ===
Starting on 7 February 2020, VTV adds Friday prime-time to this time slot.

These dramas air from 20:00 to 20:30, Monday to Friday on VTV3 instead of Monday to Thursday as before.

Broadcast	Title	Eps.	Prod.	Cast and crew	Theme song(s)	Genre	Notes
11 Jun 2020–30 Jul 2021	Xin chào hạnh phúc - Mùa 4 (Hello Happiness - Season 4)	Ep 515 to Ep 874	VTV and VietCom Film	Nguyễn Bảo Trâm (executive producer); Various Artists		Drama	A series comprises numerous short miniseries.

=== Second line-up ===
==== Monday-Tuesday/Wednesday dramas ====
Starting on 27 July 2020, the time slot was changed due to positive feedback for Tình yêu và tham vọng. It turned from 2 episodes per week on Monday & Tuesday into 3 episodes per week from Monday to Wednesday.

These dramas air from 21:30 to 22:20 (from 21:40 to 22:30 since 24 August) on VTV3.

Broadcast	Title	Eps.	Prod.	Cast and crew	Theme song(s)	Genre	Notes
23 Mar-16 Sep	Tình yêu và tham vọng (Love and Ambition)	60	VFC	Bùi Tiến Huy (director); Trịnh Đan Phượng, Trịnh Cẩm Hằng, Mai Diệp (writers); Nhan Phúc Vinh, Diễm My, Mạnh Trường, Lã Thanh Huyền, Thanh Sơn, Phan Minh Huyền, Trọng Trinh, Minh Hòa, Thanh Tú, Thùy Anh, Diễm Hương, Văn Bích, Phan Thắng, Minh Phương, Trần Đức, Phú Thăng, Nguyễn Mạnh Cường, Vũ Ngọc Châm, Trọng Lân, Vũ Thu Hoài, Bích Ngọc, Đỗ Kỷ, Thu Quế, Xuân Hồng... Cameo: Lan Phương, Linh Huệ	Nắm (Hold) by Hương Ly & Minh Vương M4U	Drama, Romance, Business	Based on Chinese drama 'Fighting Time'. Filming in Vietnam & Czech Republic. Formerly: Thế lực cạnh tranh (Competitive Forces)
21 Sep-9 Dec	Trói buộc yêu thương (Bound By Love)	36	VFC	Lê Hùng Phương (director); Chu Hồng Vân (writer); Kim Xuân, Hữu Châu, Lan Phương, Trương Thanh Long, Ngọc Lan, Tú Vi, Trương Quỳnh Anh, Lý Bình, Lê Thanh Hải, Huỳnh Nga, Văn Anh, Linh Trung, Xuân Hiệp, Đình Hiếu, Đức Thịnh, Trần Kim Hải, Hồng Phúc... Cameo: Lê Thiện, Trịnh Kim Chi	Xin lỗi (Sorry) by Nguyên Hà Cứu lấy chút tình tôi (Saving a Bit of My Love) by Trini	Drama, Family	Formerly: Lối rẽ trái muộn màng (The Belated Left Turn)
14 Dec 2020- 24 May 2021	Hướng dương ngược nắng (Extraordinary Sunflowers)	70; Pt.1: 30e Pt.2: 40e	VFC	Vũ Trường Khoa (director); Nguyễn Thu Thủy, Hân Như, Quỳnh Thy (writers); Đồng Thu Hà, Lương Thu Trang, Việt Anh, Hồng Đăng, Hồng Diễm, Doãn Quốc Đam, Đình Tú, Quỳnh Kool, Vân Dung, Đức Trung, Công Lý, Phạm Cường, Mạnh Cường, Nguyễn Mạnh Cường, Mạnh Hưng, Ngọc Tản, Thanh Hương, Minh Phương, Thạch Thu Huyền, Anh Đào, Vũ Phương, Trần Nhượng, Trần Đức, Lương Ngọc Dung, Thùy Dương, Lưu Duy Khánh, Huyền Sâm, Nguyễn Ngọc Anh, Mạnh Đạt, Tiến Minh, Hồng Hạnh, Đào Hoàng Yến, Chu Diệp Anh... Cameo: Huỳnh Anh, Đỗ Duy Nam	Tình yêu muộn màng (Belated Love) by Đồng Lan Yêu là thế ư? (Is That Love?) by Hương Ly & Tiến Minh Điều dang dở ngọt ngào nhất (The Most Sweet Unfinished Thing) by Tiến Minh	Drama, Family, Romance, Business	Ep 28-30 air on Wed-Fri (17-19 Feb 2021) since the time slot of Mon-Tue was for Tet programs.

==== Wednesday/Thursday-Friday dramas ====
Starting on 7 February 2020, VTV re-added Friday prime-time to this time slot for the first time since 2014.

The time slot was changed one more time to "Thursday and Friday" since Cát đỏ (30 July) because the Wednesday prime time was added for Tình yêu và tham vọng.

These dramas air from 21:30 to 22:20 (from 21:40 to 22:30 since 27 August), Wednesday and Thursday (before 7 February), Wednesday to Friday (7 February - 24 July), Thursday and Friday (after 24 July) on VTV3.

Broadcast	Title	Eps.	Prod.	Cast and crew	Theme song(s)	Genre	Notes
15 Jan-18 Mar	Cô gái nhà người ta (A Girl Somewhere)	25	VFC	Trịnh Lê Phong (director); Lê Huyền (writer); Đình Tú, Phương Oanh, Việt Bắc, Hương Giang, Bùi Bài Bình, Linh Huệ, Tiến Quang, Việt Hoa, Tiến Đạt, Trọng Lân, Anh Tuấn, Hoàng Du Ka, Tiến Ngọc, Quang Trọng, Kiều My, Gia Hân, Phí Thùy Linh, Hoàng Huy, Huyền Trang, Đình Chiến...	Cô gái nhà người ta (A Girl Somewhere) by Huyền PK	Rural, Drama, Romance	First 6 eps airs on Wed-Thu Formerly: Chuyện làng Đẩu (Story in Đẩu Village)
19 Mar-5 Jun	Nhà trọ Balanha (Balanha Homestay)	35	VFC	Nguyễn Khải Anh (director); Đỗ Thủy Tiên, Lại Phương Thảo (writers); Xuân Nghị, Công Dương, Trần Nghĩa, Trần Vân, Bích Ngọc, Quỳnh Kool, Kiên Hoàng, Vũ Thu Hoài, Trần Đức, Anh Thơ, Hoàng Long, Lý Chí Huy, Duy Hưng, Hoàng Mai Anh, Nguyễn Thùy Anh, Ngọc Thu, Xuân Trường, Mai Như Quỳnh, Kiều Yến Ngọc, Andrea Aybar, Tiến Lộc, Phùng Cường, Hàn Trang... Cameo: Thanh Sơn, Khải Anh, MC Thảo Vân, Hoàng Dũng, Thu Quỳnh, Hồng Diễm, Bảo Thanh, Đỗ Thanh Hải, Liên Tít	'Nhà trọ Balanha' theme song (parody of Hoàng Thùy Linh's Giấu) by Balanha Main Cast	Comedy, Romance, Drama, Youth	Based on K-drama Welcome to Waikiki (jTBC 2018). Ep 35 aired in two versions: 45′ ver. on TV and 60′ ver. on vtvgiaitri app.
10 Mar-20 Mar (VTV1); 10 Jun-24 Jul (VTV3)	Đừng bắt em phải quên (Don't Force Me to Forget)	30; 9e (30′)+ 21e (45′)	VFC	Vũ Minh Trí (director); Dương Đặng Linh Đan / Thu Thủy, Vân Anh (writers); Thanh Sơn, Quỳnh Kool, Hoàng Hải, Quách Thu Phương, Kim Oanh, Như Quỳnh, Hoàng Xuân, Lâm Tùng, Kiều My, Châu Dương, Lâm Đức Anh, Hoàng Mai Anh, Ngọc Crystal Eyes, Mạnh Hưng, Nguyễn Nhàn, Trang Hoàng, Trương Hoàng, Ánh Tuyết... / Linh Huệ, Xuân Hùng, Việt Hoa	Gió mùa thu năm ấy (That Autumn, the Wind Blows); Credit version by Phương Linh; Background version by Minh Vương	Drama, Romance, Marriage	Stopped on VTV1 after ep 9 due to the broadcast schedule for COVID-19, then replaced by 'Mùa xuân ở lại' re-rls ver.
30 Jul-12 Nov	Cát đỏ (Red Sand)	30	VFC	Lưu Trọng Ninh (director & writer); Thúy Diễm, Trinh Tuyết Hương, Nguyễn Hoàng Thúy Nga, Hữu Thanh Tùng, Võ Cảnh, Thạch Kim Long, Võ Nghi Bình, Ngọc Anh, Thạch Ngọc Khánh, Kim Huyền, Phạm Thanh Yến, Thu Cúc, Mã Trung, Hữu Bình, Hữu Phước, Phi Điểu, Yến Vi, Trọng Thành...	Chuyện của cát (The Story of Sand) by Dương Trường Giang Ghen (Jealous) by Tùng Dương	Drama, Romance	Delayed 1 ep on 14 Aug during national mourning.
13 Nov 2020- 9 Apr 2021	Cảnh sát hình sự: Hồ sơ cá sấu (Criminal Police: The Crocodile File)	38	VFC	Nguyễn Mai Hiền (director); Tạ Hồng Minh (writer); Mạnh Trường, Kiều Anh, Phan Minh Huyền, Việt Anh, Doãn Quốc Đam, Ngọc Quỳnh, Hoàng Hải, Lan Phương, Bảo Anh, Trọng Lân, Hoàng Phúc Anh, Anh Tuấn, Duy Hưng, Danh Thái, Phùng Đức Hiếu, Đào Thúy Hường, Chu Quỳnh Chi, Đức Hùng, Hoàng Dũng/Trần Đức, Việt Thắng, Phú Thăng, Đỗ Kỷ, Bình Xuyên, Tuấn Cường, Tuấn Anh, Bá Anh, Đào Hoàng Yến, Vĩnh Xương, Phương Hạnh, Hồ Phong, Đình Chiến, Tiến Ngọc,...		Crime, Drama, Marriage	Delayed 5 eps on 20 Nov 2020, 11-12 & 18-19 Feb 2021. Formerly: Không lối thoát (No Way Out)

== VTV3 Weekend Afternoon dramas ==
These dramas air from 14:00 to 14:50, Saturday and Sunday on VTV3.

Broadcast	Title	Eps.	Prod.	Cast and crew	Theme song(s)	Genre	Notes
11 Apr–26 Jul	Những nàng dâu nổi loạn (Disruptive Daughters-In-Law)	32	MegaGS	Xuân Phước (director); Phạm Tân, Huỳnh Tuấn Anh (writers); Lương Thế Thành, Bella Mai, Lê Bê La, Công Ninh, Thanh Dậu, Võ Minh Bảo, Hoàng Kim, Phi Bảo, Mỹ Hạnh, Hoàng Phi, Huỳnh Anh Tuấn, Giang Bích Phượng, Bích Duyên, Thanh Tùng, Mai Phượng, Thanh Hiền...	Em sẽ yêu (I'm Gonna Love) by Thúy Vân	Comedy, Family, Drama	
1 Aug-6 Dec	Yêu trong đau thương (Love in Pain)	38	MegaGS	Chu Thiện (director); Nguyễn Thị Mộng Thu (writer); Kim Xuân, Thanh Nam, Bella Mai, Đăng Dũng, Nhật Hạ, Kiều Khanh, Thanh Thức, Ngân Quỳnh, Hoàng Nguyên, Thanh Bình, Minh Trân, Quang Đáng, Phi Điểu...	Lệ ca (Song of Tears) by Minh Trang; Xót xa (Lament) by Duyên Quỳnh	Drama, Family, Old-fashioned	
12 Dec 2020- 1 May 2021	Ngày em đến (The Day You Come)	37	MegaGS	Đinh Đức Liêm (director); Phượng Vỹ (writer); Bạch Công Khanh, Hạ Anh, Cao Minh Đạt, Thân Thúy Hà, Đăng Dũng, Lương Ánh Ngọc, Lam Tuyền, Lê Minh Thành, Quang Thái, Trần Bích Hằng, Thanh Ngọc, Nghinh Lộc, Ngân Châu...	Ngày em đến (The Day You Come) by Tuyết Mai	Drama, Family	Delayed 4 eps on 13-14 & 20-21 Feb 2021.

== See also ==
- List of dramas broadcast by Vietnam Television (VTV)
- List of dramas broadcast by Hanoi Radio Television (HanoiTV)
- List of dramas broadcast by Vietnam Digital Television (VTC)
