= List of VTV dramas broadcast in 2016 =

This is a list of VTV dramas released in 2016.

←2015 - 2016 - 2017→

== VTV Special Tet dramas ==
This drama airs from 20:10 to 21:00, 27th-28th & 1st-2nd Tet holiday on VTV1.

Broadcast	Title	Eps.	Prod.	Cast and crew	Theme song(s)	Genre	Notes
5-9 Feb	Lời nói dối ngọt ngào (A Sweet Lie)	4	VFC	Vũ Hồng Sơn (director); Chu Hồng Vân (writer); Anh Thái, Kiên Hoàng, Lê Phương Anh, Lan Phương, Bình Minh, Vân Dung, Quang Thắng, Ngô Phương Linh...	Đón Tết (Welcoming Tet) by Trà My	Romance	Filming in Vietnam and Czech Republic

== VTV1 Weeknight Prime-time dramas ==
=== Monday-Wednesday dramas ===
These dramas air from 20:45 to 21:30, Monday to Wednesday on VTV1.

Starting in June 2016, the time slot 'Monday and Tuesday' was changed to 'Monday to Wednesday'. Only Mạch ngầm vùng biên ải was aired on Monday and Tuesday due to the old time slot.

Broadcast	Title	Eps.	Prod.	Cast and crew	Theme song(s)	Genre	Notes
5 Jan-17 May	Mạch ngầm vùng biên ải (Hidden Line in the Borderland)	34	VFC	Bùi Huy Thuần (director); Nguyễn Văn Cự, Đoàn Hữu Nam (writers); Bảo Anh, Hồng Kim Hạnh, Đình Tú, Tùng Dương, Xuân Tùng, Sơn Tùng, Đình Chiến, Hoàng Tùng, Doãn Quốc Đam, Thiên Kiều, Vân Anh, Đỗ Duy Nam, Trung Cường, Tiến Huy, Nguyễn Huy, Tuấn Cường, Nguyễn Lan Hương, Vĩnh Xương, Tiến Mộc...	Mảnh đời trắng đen (The Life Between Black and White) by Minh Chuyên	Crime, Drama, Romance	Airs on Monday and Tuesday
23 May-19 Sep	Đồng tiền quỷ ám (Evil Money)	46	VTV and VFS	Trần Chí Thành (director); Nguyễn Như Phong (writer); Đức Sơn, Huỳnh Anh Tuấn, Công Hậu, Thân Thúy Hà, Công Dũng, Hà Việt Dũng, Thạch Kim Long, Cao Thái Hà, Kha Ly, Hoàng Anh, Mỹ Duyên, Lý Anh Tuấn, Hoàng Đức...	Sắc màu (Colors) by Trà My; Lạc lối (Lost) by Dương Trường Giang	Crime, Drama, Political	First 4 eps air on Mon-Tue. The rest air on Mon to Wed. Filming in Vietnam & Cambodia.
20 Sep-19 Dec	Hợp đồng hôn nhân (Marriage Contract)	35	VTV and Khải Hưng Film	Nguyễn Khải Hưng (director); Hoàng Nhung (writer); Bảo Thanh, Tô Dũng, Lâm Vissay, Kiên Trung, Phương Oanh, Phú Thăng, Phương Hạnh, Lý Thanh Kha, Thu An, Phú Đôn, Thùy Liên, Trịnh Huyền, Nguyễn Oanh, Thu Phương...	Trả lại yêu thương (Return the Love) by Minh Thu	Romance, Comedy, Drama	
20 Dec 2016– 20 Mar 2017	Ngự lâm không kiếm (Musketeer Without Sword)	32	VTV and M&T Pictures	Trần Chí Thành (director); Đoàn Phú Vinh, Lê Anh Thúy, Nguyễn Ngân Hà (writers); Ngọc Thoa, Quế Hằng, Trung Anh, Tùng Dương, Thanh Bình, Huyền Trang, Lương Giang, Kiên Hoàng, Lưu Đê Ly...	Ngự lâm không kiếm (Musketeer Without Sword) & Cuộc đời (Life) by Tiến Minh	Drama, Family, Comedy	Produced in 2014

=== Thursday-Friday dramas ===
These dramas air from 20:45 to 21:30, Thursday and Friday on VTV1.

Starting in June 2016, the time slot 'Wednesday to Friday' was changed to 'Thursday and Friday'. Only Gia phả của đất was aired on Wednesday to Friday due to the old time slot.

Broadcast	Title	Eps.	Prod.	Cast and crew	Theme song(s)	Genre	Notes
24 Mar-7 Jul	Gia phả của đất (Genealogy of the Land)	38	VFC	Trần Quốc Trọng (director); Đặng Tất Bình (writer); Hoàng Hải, Đàm Hằng, Đỗ Kỷ, Phú Đôn, Đình Chiến, Huyền Sâm, Danh Tùng, Huyền Trang, Minh Châu, Ngô Minh, Phạm Dương, Bá Anh, Trí Tuệ, Nguyễn Oanh, Dương Khánh, Tạ Thu, Thùy Linh, Hoàng Huy, Chí Kiên, Ngọc Thu, Thanh Hòa, Mậu Hòa, Hương Lan, Nga Hương, Xuân Nam, Duy Anh, Lý Thanh Kha, Danh Thái, Phạm Thị An, Phạm Thị Lý...	Cổng làng (The Village Gate); Nursery Rhymes version by Ngọc Linh, Minh Phương & Mỹ Hạnh - Opening; Contemporary Folk version by Hoàng Tùng & Mai Hoa - Ending	Rural, Drama, Political	From ep 1 to ep 28 air on Wed to Fri. Adapted from novel of the same name by Hoàng Minh Tường. Remake of Chuyện đã qua (2000).
8 Jul-1 Dec	Lựa chọn cuối cùng (The Last Choice)	38	VFC	Vũ Hồng Sơn (director); Chu Hồng Vân, Nguyễn Tuấn Thành (writers); Mạnh Cường, Hoàng Xuân, Chí Nhân, Thanh Sơn, Minh Hà, Tạ Minh Thảo, Phương Hạnh, Tạ Am, Bùi Xuân Thảo, Duy Thanh, Chí Cường, Huy Trinh, Xuân Tùng, Huyền Trang, Lệ Quyên, Hoàng Công, Tuấn Cương, Doãn Quốc Đam, Tạ Vũ Thu, Hồng Quang, Phú Thăng, Bình Xuyên, Chí Dương, Quang Lâm, Thanh Tùng...	Nếu em được chọn lựa (If I Could Choose) by Lệ Quyên	Political, Drama, Crime	
2 Dec 2016- 31 Mar 2017	Chiều ngang qua phố cũ (Twilight on the Old Town)	26	VFC	Trịnh Lê Phong (director); Nguyễn Hồng Trâm, Chu Hồng Vân (writers); Bùi Bài Bình, Minh Trang, Anh Tú, Kim Oanh, Xuân Trường, Hoàng Lan, Công Lý, Hoa Thúy, Thanh Sơn, Trần Nghĩa, Quang Anh, Hà Anh, Thạch Thu Huyền, Trần Vân, Phạm Hồng Minh, Vinh Kiên, Huyền Trang, Kiều Trang...	Thật lòng không muốn xa (Heartily Don't Want to Leave) & Chiều ngang phố cũ (Through Old Street An Afternoon) by Minh Quân	Drama, Family	

== VTV3 Weeknight Prime-time dramas ==
=== Monday-Tuesday dramas ===
These dramas air from 21:10 to 22:00, Monday and Tuesday on VTV3.

Broadcast	Title	Eps.	Prod.	Cast and crew	Theme song(s)	Genre	Notes
13 Jun-14 Nov	Nguyệt thực (Eclipse)	45	VTV and THL Media Corp	Nguyễn Trọng Hải (director); Chu Thu Hằng (writer); Minh Luân, Thiên Bảo, Ninh Dương Lan Ngọc, Tường Vy, Kha Ly, Đức Thịnh, Đào Bá Sơn, Đào Anh Tuấn, Quốc Hùng, Mai Huỳnh, Hải Lý, Don Nguyễn...	Ánh sáng ngày mới (New Day's Light) by Dương Hoàng Yến & Ngọc Minh; Vậy là đủ (That's Enough) by Hồ Thu Phương	Drama, Business	
15 Nov 2016- 2 May 2017	Ngày mai ánh sáng (Bright Tomorrow)	46	VTV and HDFilm	Lê Minh (director); Thảo Ngân, Đặng Trần Triều Thanh (writers); Bình Minh, Trang Nhung, Đoàn Thanh Tài, Hồng Nhung, Hoàng Anh, Quang Hòa, Quốc Hùng, Hoàng Trinh, Bảo Trân...	Tìm lại lời yêu (Words of Love Again) by Hoàng Thu Trang	Drama	Delayed 3 eps on 5 Dec & 30-31 Jan.

=== Wednesday–Thursday dramas ===
These dramas air from 21:10 to 22:00, Wednesday and Thursday on VTV3.

Broadcast	Title	Eps.	Prod.	Cast and crew	Theme song(s)	Genre	Notes
24 Feb-29 Jun	Những ngọn nến trong đêm 2 (Candle in the Night 2)	36	VFC and Tincom Media	Nguyễn Khải Anh (director); Đặng Minh Châu (writer); Mai Thu Huyền, Bình Minh, Bá Anh, Đinh Y Nhung, Kỳ Hân, Chi Bảo, Anh Tài, Mỹ Uyên, Lan Trinh, Xuân Phúc, Andrea Aybar, Trương Nam Thành, Dương Yến Ngọc, Diệu Thuần, Hữu Độ, Tuyết Liên, Phú Thăng, Bích Thủy, Xuân Hồng...	Tạm biệt (Goodbye) by Minh Quân	Drama	Following up Những ngọn nến trong đêm (2002)
30 Jun-2 Nov	Zippo, mù tạt và em (Zippo, Mustard and You)	36; Pt.1: 10e Pt.2: 26e	VFC	Trọng Trinh, Bùi Tiến Huy (directors); Nguyễn Thu Thủy, Trịnh Cẩm Hằng, Trịnh Khánh Hà (writers); Nhã Phương, Phạm Anh Tuấn, Bình An, Kiều My, Vinh Kiên, Hoàng Hạnh / Lã Thanh Huyền, Hồng Đăng, Mạnh Trường, Minh Hương, Trọng Nhân, Thanh Vân Hugo, Việt Anh, Vân Anh, Quế Hằng, Huyền Trang, Viết Liên, Trọng Trinh, Nguyệt Hằng, Thanh Hương, Kiên Hoàng... Cameo: Đinh Mạnh Ninh	Anh vẫn nhớ em (Still Miss You) by Phạm Quốc Huy; Thôi (How to Forget) by Giang Hồng Ngọc; Quay lại (Getting Back) by Trang Pháp	Romance, Drama	
3 Nov 2016- 22 Mar 2017	Tuổi thanh xuân 2 (Forever Young 2)	38	VFC and CJ E&M	Nguyễn Khải Anh, Bùi Tiến Huy, Lee Jeong Wook (directors); Kang Ji Sook, Đặng Diệu Hương (writers); Nhã Phương, Kang Tae Oh, Mạnh Trường, Jung Hae Na, Hồng Đăng, Shin Hae Sun, Tiến Đạt, Minh Châu, Trọng Trinh, Minh Hòa, Son Jong Hak, Lee Ah Hyun, Sơn Tùng, Lý Chí Huy, Vân Anh, Khuất Quỳnh Hoa, Nguyễn Kim Oanh, Tiến Ngọc, Anh Dũng...	Cứ thế (And So On) by Hà Anh Tuấn; Đến bên em (Come Beside Me) by Hồ Quỳnh Hương; Tạm biệt anh (Goodbye to You) by Trang Pháp	Romance, Drama	Following up Tuổi thanh xuân (2014). Filming in Vietnam & South Korea.

== VTV3 Rubic 8 dramas ==
These dramas air from 14:20 to 15:10, Saturday and Sunday on VTV3 as a part of the program Rubic 8.

Broadcast	Title	Eps.	Prod.	Cast and crew	Theme song(s)	Genre	Notes
2 Jan-17 Apr	Bốn cuộc tình, một người đàn ông (One Man 4 Love)	32	VFC	Đặng Tất Bình (director); Nguyễn Thu Phương, Tống Thị Phương Dung (writers); Anh Thư, Lâm Minh Thắng, Đoàn Thanh Tài, Thúy Ngân, Khánh Huyền, Trúc Nguyễn, Thiên Thanh, Khôi Trần, Thương Tín, Đào Bá Sơn, Lan Hương, Hồng Vân...	Chỉ có mình em thôi (You Only Have Me Alone) by Nguyễn Ngọc Anh	Drama	
23 Apr-24 Jul	Giọt nước mắt muộn màng (Too Late For Tears)	28	VFC	Nguyễn Danh Dũng (director); Kim Ngân, Hà Anh Thu (writers); Kiều Anh, Lâm Vissay, Thúy An, Thiện Tùng, Hồ Liên, Linh Miu, An Chinh, Phú Đôn, Vân Anh...	Ảo ảnh (Illusion) by Minh Chuyên	Drama	
30 Jul-20 Nov	Bồng bềnh trên sông (Bobbing on the River)	34	VFC	Lê Hùng Phương (director); Huỳnh Mẫn Chi (writer); Công Ninh, Cát Tường, Trung Dũng, Phan Như Thảo, Phạm Kiều Khanh, Phương Thanh, Kiều Minh Tuấn, Phương Bình, Trọng Khang...	Bồng bềnh con nước (Bobbing Water) by Hồng Phượng; Xuôi mái chèo (Paddling Down) by Trọng Phúc & Trung Dũng	Drama, Rural	
26 Nov 2016- 26 Mar 2017	Điều bí mật (The Secret)	36	VFC	Mai Hồng Phong (director); Thu Trang, Thủy Tiên, Quỳnh Lam, Song Thy, Hồng Hạnh, Mai Linh (writers); Hương Dung, Văn Báu, Chí Nhân, Phan Minh Huyền, Thanh Hương, Công Dũng, Nguyễn Đức Trung, Lê Quốc Thắng, Sơn Tùng, Trần Nhượng, Vân Anh, Diệp Bích, Đồng Thanh Bình, Hồ Liên, Nguyễn Kim Oanh, Viết Liên, Hoàng Yến, Huyền Thanh, Hương Giang, Hồng Nguyên, Phương Hạnh, Thế Bình, Tạ Am...	Đừng vội (Don't Hurry) by Thùy Chi	Drama, Family	Adapted from the novel of the same name by Hân Như

== See also ==
- List of dramas broadcast by Vietnam Television (VTV)
- List of dramas broadcast by Hanoi Radio Television (HanoiTV)
- List of dramas broadcast by Vietnam Digital Television (VTC)
