= List of VTV dramas broadcast in 2017 =

This is a list of VTV dramas released in 2017.

←2016 - 2017 - 2018→

== VTV Special Tet dramas ==
These dramas air on VTV1 in the time of Lunar New Year. The 4-episodes drama airs from 3rd to 6th Tet holiday, from 20:10 to 20:55.

Broadcast	Title	Eps.	Prod.	Cast and crew	Theme song(s)	Genre	Notes
22 Jan; Re-release: 30 Jan-1 Feb 2019	Dưới bầu trời xa cách (Under the Same Sky)	1 (120′); Re-rls: 3 (40′)	VFC and QAB	Vũ Trường Khoa, Đào Duy Phúc (directors); Mieko Shimojima, Nguyễn Thu Thủy (writers); Quang Sự, Miyagi Karin, Teruya Toshiyuki, Chí Nhân, Viết Liên, Hương Giang, Đình Tú, Toshiyoki Teruya, Yoshida Taeko, Kyan Hitomi, Arakaki Masahiro, Kuroshima Emiru...		Drama, Romance	Airs 20:45 -22:40 as episode of VTV Special. Re-rls ver airs 21:00 -21:30. Filming in Japan.
30 Jan-2 Feb; Re-release: 28 Oct-5 Nov 2021	Mátxcơva - Mùa thay lá (Moscow in Season of Falling Leaves)	4 (60′); Re-rls: 7 (30′)	VFC	Trọng Trinh (director); Trịnh Khánh Hà, Nguyễn Thị Kim Ngân (writers); Hồng Đăng, Hồng Diễm, Việt Anh, Lê Phương Anh, Trọng Trinh, Thùy Linh, Thu Trang...	Я спросил у ясеня (I Asked the Ash Tree) by Alexander Rybak; Криком журавлиным (Crane's Crying) by Vitas	Romance	Filming in Moscow, Russia. Re-rls ver airs 21:00 -21:30. Formerly: Tìm nhau trong nỗi nhớ (Finding Each Other in Nostalgia)

== VTV1 Weeknight Prime-time dramas ==
=== Monday-Wednesday dramas ===
These dramas air from 20:45 to 21:30, Monday to Wednesday on VTV1. Only Nơi ẩn nấp bình yên was aired on Monday and Tuesday.

Broadcast	Title	Eps.	Prod.	Cast and crew	Theme song(s)	Genre	Notes
21 Mar-13 Jun	Nơi ẩn nấp bình yên (The Peaceful Shelter)	27	VTV and Khải Hưng Film	Nguyễn Đức Hiếu (director); Đỗ Trí Hùng (writer); Phan Ngọc Lan, Phạm Hồng Minh, Mạnh Trường, Thu Quỳnh, Thùy Dương, Thanh Hoa, Trung Anh, Thanh Tùng, Lý Chí Huy, Diễm Hương, Vũ Thu Hoài, Ngọc Căn, Việt Bắc...	Hạnh phúc khi còn mẹ (Blessed to Have My Mom)	Drama, Family	First 5 eps air on Mon to Wed. The rest air on Mon-Tues. Produced in 2014.
19 Jun-10 Oct	Giao mùa (Changing of the Seasons)	45	VTV and Galaxy Studio	Trần Hoài Sơn (director); Nguyễn Thanh Bình, Bùi Thúy Hà, Trần Phương Nhung (writers); Phan Minh Huyền, Công Dũng, Tiến Lộc, Thanh Huyền, Thùy Dương, Chí Nhân, Lan Hương 'Bông', Lê Mai, Thanh Quý, Tuyết Mai, Thanh Chi, Minh Phương, Phú Thăng, Diệp Bích, Thế Bình, Tiến Đạt...	'Giao mùa' 's unnamed opening song & Chút tình mùa lá bay (A Little Love in Season of Flying Leaves) by Nguyễn Đức Cường	Drama	Formerly: Hoa sữa cuối thu (Late Fall Milkwood) Produced in 2012.
11 Oct 2017– 17 Jan 2018	Hoa cỏ may 3 (Lovegrass 3)	39	VTV and T.N&K Advertising Co.Ltd	Lưu Trọng Ninh (director & writer); Cường Seven, Hạnh Sino, Quyết Thắng, Thanh Giang, Lương Giang, Trung Anh, Vân Anh, Hải Anh, Công Dũng, Mỹ Hạnh, Nguyễn Hà, Thiện Tùng, Tùng Dương, Tố Uyên, Hương Dung...	Hoa cỏ may (Lovegrass) by Trần Thu Hà; Ngơ ngác cỏ may (Bewildered Like Lovegrass) by Hồng Dương	Drama	a.k.a Hoa cỏ may: Những ngày giông bão (Lovegrass: Stormy Days). Following up Hoa cỏ may 1 & 2 (2001). Produced in 2013.

=== Thursday-Friday dramas ===
These dramas air from 20:45 to 21:30, Thursday and Friday on VTV1. Only Sống chung với mẹ chồng was aired on Wednesday to Friday due to audience's positive effect.

Broadcast	Title	Eps.	Prod.	Cast and crew	Theme song(s)	Genre	Notes
5 Apr-30 Jun	Sống chung với mẹ chồng (Living with Mother-in-Law)	34	VFC	Vũ Trường Khoa (director); Đặng Thiếu Ngân (writer); Lan Hương 'Bông', Bảo Thanh, Anh Dũng, Trần Đức, Lan Hương, Thu Quỳnh, Danh Tùng, Minh Phương, Công Lý, Hoàng Thu Trang, Thế Nguyên, Vân Anh, Nguyễn Trang, Việt Anh, Thanh Tú, Thanh Hương, Hương Giang, Cẩm Vân, Anh Đức...	Hạnh phúc mong manh (Fragile Happiness) by Khánh Linh	Marriage, Drama	Adapted from Chinese novel 'Living with Mother-in-Law' by The Seabed Witch (Jia Xiao). Delay 2 eps on 19 May & 1 Jun. Last 4 eps air on Thu-Fri.
6 Jul-14 Sep	Những người nhiều chuyện (The Neighborhood Stories)	20	VFC	Lê Mạnh, Trần Quốc Trọng (directors); Nguyễn Hồng Vân, Hoàng Thị Hồng Hạnh (writers); Thanh Sơn, Trịnh Khánh Linh, Minh Hòa, Thúy Phương, Đức Khuê, Hà Trung, Thu Huyền, Quang Thắng, Ngọc Trâm, Trần Việt Hoa, Quang Minh...	Chuông gió tình yêu (Wind Chimes of Love) by Phương Huyền	Comedy, Romance	Formerly: Chuông gió tình yêu (Wind Chimes of Love)
15 Sep 2017- 19 Jan 2018	Ngược chiều nước mắt (Tears in Reverse)	36	VFC	Vũ Minh Trí (director); Nguyễn Vũ Hà An, Trịnh Khánh Hà, Nguyễn Thu Trang (writers); Phương Oanh, Mạnh Trường, Thu Quỳnh, Phan Minh Huyền, Hà Việt Dũng, Hoàng Hải, Lan Hương, Phạm Anh Tuấn, Bình An, Hoàng Thu Trang, Anh Dũng, Ngô Thủy Tiên, Trung Anh, Đình Tú, Chu Diệp Anh...	Ngược chiều nước mắt (Tears in Reverse) by Si Giáng; Giấc mơ nhẹ nhàng (Sleazy Dream) by Minh Vương & Thùy Chi	Drama, Family, Marriage	

== VTV3 Weeknight Prime-time dramas ==
=== First line-up ===
New time slot on VTV3. These dramas air from 20:00 to 20:30, Monday to Thursday.

Broadcast	Title	Eps.	Prod.	Cast and crew	Theme song(s)	Genre	Notes
2 Jan-6 Jul	Gia đình vui nhộn (The Funny Family)	100	BHD	Nguyễn Minh Chung (director & writer); Quang Minh, Hồng Đào, Gia Lộc, Bảo Bảo, An Khang, Lê Bình, Thùy Dung, Mạc Văn Khoa...		Family, Comedy	Based on American series 'Home Improvement'
10 Jul-28 Dec	Xin chào hạnh phúc - Mùa 1 (Hello Happiness - Season 1)	Ep 1 to Ep 100	VTV and VietCom Film	Nguyễn Bảo Trâm (executive producer); Various Artists		Drama	A series comprises numerous short miniseries

=== Second line-up ===
==== Monday-Tuesday dramas ====
These dramas air from 21:40 to 22:30, Monday and Tuesday on VTV3.

Broadcast	Title	Eps.	Prod.	Cast and crew	Theme song(s)	Genre	Notes
8 May-15 Aug	Bước nhảy hoàn vũ (Dancing with the Stars)	30	VTV and Cat Tien Sa	Nguyễn Đức Việt (directors); Vân Vũ, Thu Trang (writers); Kinh Quốc, Ngọc Quyên, Công Hậu, Yến Trang, Huy Cường, Trương Thế Vinh, Maya, Lan Trương...	Bước nhảy hoàn vũ (Dancing with the Stars) by Dương Hoàng Yến; Dấu yêu xưa (Old Darling) by Bùi Anh Tuấn	Drama	Inspired by show 'Dancing with the Stars' (VN version). Produced in 2014.
21 Aug 2017- 23 Jan 2018	Vực thẳm vô hình (Invisible Deep)	46	VTV and VnFilm	Lê Minh (director); Phạm Văn Thành (writer); Trương Minh Quốc Thái, Trang Nhung, Sỹ Toàn, Yến Nhi, Đức Nhã, Đức Thịnh, Hoàng Anh, Trà My, Kim Cương, Diễm My, Hoàng Đức, Kim Va...	Về với ngày mai (Back to Tomorrow) by Minh Chuyên	Drama, Crime	Produced in 2014.

==== Wednesday–Thursday dramas ====
These dramas air from 21:40 to 22:30, Wednesday and Thursday on VTV3.

Broadcast	Title	Eps.	Prod.	Cast and crew	Theme song(s)	Genre	Notes
23 Mar-31 Aug; Prequel: 21&28 May; 4&9 Jun (on vtvgiaitri)	Cảnh sát hình sự: Người phán xử (The Arbitrator)	47+4	VFC	Nguyễn Mai Hiền, Nguyễn Khải Anh, Nguyễn Danh Dũng (directors); Nguyễn Trung Dũng, Khánh Bùi (writers); Hoàng Dũng, Việt Anh, Hồng Đăng, Trung Anh, Chu Hùng, Bảo Anh, Doãn Quốc Đam, Thanh Quý, Quốc Trọng, Đan Lê, Lưu Đê Ly, Thùy Dương, Bảo Thanh, Vũ Thu Hoài, Thanh Hương, Anh Đức, Trọng Hùng, Danh Thái, Thanh Bi, Thúy An, Đỗ Kỷ... (Prequel: Vân Dung, Tạ Minh Thảo, Thanh Sơn, Tùng Dương, Anh Tuấn)		Crime, Drama	Based on Israeli series Ha-Borer (Hot Channel 3 2007). 25 min/1 prequel episode.
6 Sep-7 Dec	Ghét thì yêu thôi (I Love You Because I Hate You)	28	VFC	Trịnh Lê Phong (director); Lê Huyền, Trần Diệu Linh (writers); Lê Phương Anh, Đình Tú, Chí Trung, Vân Dung, Hoàng Thu Trang, Danh Tùng, Ngọc Dũng, Tùng Lan, Hải Anh, Mạnh Hưng, Trần Đức, Ngọc Quỳnh, Vũ Thu Hoài...	Ghét thì yêu thôi (I Love You Because I Hate You); Càng ghét càng yêu (More Hate, More Love) by My My & Sơn Việt	Comedy, Romance	
13 Dec 2017- 23 Aug 2018; Crossover with 'Người phán xử' & 'Phía trước là bầu trời': 11 May 2018; Extra Story: 23 Aug 2018 (on vtvgiaitri)	Cả một đời ân oán (Life of Love and Feud)	72+2; Pt.1: 34e Pt.2: 38e	VFC	Trọng Trinh, Vũ Trường Khoa, Bùi Tiến Huy (directors); Phạm Phương Thảo, Hoàng Hồng Hạnh, Nguyễn Thu Trang (writers); Mạnh Cường, Mỹ Uyên, Mạnh Trường, Hồng Diễm, Hồng Đăng, Lan Phương, Thanh Sơn, Đan Lê, Thiện Tùng, Huỳnh Anh/Chí Bách, Hạ Anh, Phạm Anh Tuấn, Lương Thanh, Kiên Hoàng, Thùy Anh, Trọng Lân, Minh Phương, Thanh Quý, Đình Tú, Minh Vượng, Anh Thơ, Kiều My, Phan Thắng, Hằng Nga, Trần Đức, Thúy An, Phương Lâm...	Khi tình yêu bắt đầu (When Love Begins) by Khánh Linh; Chờ yêu (Await Love) by Kim Thành; Cả một đời yêu thương (In Love For Life) by Minh Vương	Drama, Family, Romance	Based on Taiwanese drama Noble Bride: Regretless Love (HunanTV 2013). First project with both 4K filming and synchronous recording. Formerly: Ân oán tình đời (Grace, Enmity and Love)

== VTV3 Rubic 8 dramas ==
These dramas air from 14:20 to 15:10, Saturday and Sunday on VTV3 as a part of the program Rubic 8. The time slot was closed after this year.

Broadcast	Title	Eps.	Prod.	Cast and crew	Theme song(s)	Genre	Notes
1 Apr-16 Jul; Re-release: 11 Feb-5 Apr 2019	Lặng yên dưới vực sâu (Silence of the Abyss)	32 (45′); Re-rls: 40 (25′)	VFC	Đào Duy Phúc (director); Đỗ Bích Thủy (writer); Phương Oanh, Đình Tú, Doãn Quốc Đam, Hương Giang, Bùi Bài Bình, Minh Phương, Tiến Mộc, Minh Nguyệt, Trịnh Huyền, Xuân Trường, Huy Toàn, Nguyễn Lan Hương...	Lặng yên (Silent) by Bùi Anh Tuấn & Ái Phương	Drama, Romance, Ethnic	Adapted from short story of the same name by Đỗ Bích Thủy. Re-rls ver. airs 21:00 -21:30 as a demo for new 30min time slot on VTV1.
22 Jul-29 Oct	Đi qua mùa hạ (Through the Summer)	30	VFC	Bùi Quốc Việt (director); Nguyễn Minh Nguyệt, Trịnh Khánh Hà (writers); Linh Chi, Bình An, Đình Tú, Quỳnh Đan, Quỳnh Kool, Thanh Quý, Quế Hằng, Hoàng Huy, Thanh Hiền, Hoàng Xuân, Nguyễn Trọng Hưng, Vũ Phan Anh...	Trở lại với nhau (Getting Back Together) by Phạm Quốc Huy	Drama, Romance, Rural	Formerly: Vòng tay bè bạn (Friends' Hands in Hands)
4 Nov 2017- 4 Mar 2018	Thương nhớ ở ai (The Plethora of Yearning)	34	VFC	Lưu Trọng Ninh, Bùi Thọ Thịnh (directors); Lưu Trọng Ninh (writer); Lâm Vissay, Hồng Kim Hạnh, Thiện Tùng, Ngọc Anh, Jimmii Khánh, Thanh Hương, Thanh Ngoan, Minh Đức, Trương Phương, Phạm Đức Hải, Phạm Thị An, Đinh Hồng Sơn...	Trầu không (Betel) by Hồng Duyên	Drama, Rural, Period	Adapted from the novel of "Bến không chồng' by Dương Hướng. The last drama series airing on Rubic 8 time slot.

== VTV6 Weeknight dramas ==
The time slot was opened only in 2017 to release warehoused Vietnamese dramas. It was preceded and followed by foreign dramas.

These dramas air from 21:00 to 21:45, Monday to Friday on VTV6.

Broadcast	Title	Eps.	Prod.	Cast and crew	Theme song(s)	Genre	Notes
6 Apr-19 May	Trả giá (Payment)	30	VietCom Film	Nhâm Minh Hiền (director); Thụy Như, Phùng Vũ Uyên, Nguyễn Thị Phương Thảo (writers); Phạm Cường, Quốc Trường, Nhã Phương, Thùy Trang, Tuyết Thu, Quang Thảo, Linh Tý, Đình Hiếu, Hồng Kim Hạnh, Hoàng Thành, Đức Nhã...	Mặt nạ (Mask) by Tấn Đạt	Drama, Crime	Produced in 2013.
22 May-29 Jun	Nhân tình lạc lối (Astral Lovers)	28	V-Art Films	Lê Bảo Trung (director); Phan Ngọc Diễm Hân (writer); Chi Bảo, Ninh Dương Lan Ngọc, Huỳnh Đông, Đào Bá Sơn, Phùng Ngọc Huy, Đồng Thanh Phong, Tùng Haru, Bá Trường, Thanh Ngọc, Hà Linh, Tam Thanh, Amy Hương, Nguyễn Hiếu, Kim Dung, Trúc Vân...	Đường tình lạc lối (Astral Love) & Bước qua lỗi lầm (Over the Mistake) by Sơn Ca; Anh khóc mình anh (Cry Alone) by Yra Hoàng Thy	Drama	Produced in 2014.
30 Jun-8 Sep	Thảm đỏ (Red Carpet)	36	World Star Group	Võ Thanh Hòa, Kim Hyo Young (directors); Võ Tấn Bình (writer); Lương Thế Thành, Hoàng Oanh, Phan Thị Mơ, Chi Bảo, Huỳnh Anh Tuấn, Cao Hoàng, Thanh Nga, Thủy Phạm, La Thành, Lã Thiên Cầm...	Lấp lánh ánh sao (Twinkle Star) by Kha Ly; Bước chân thảm đỏ (Step on Red Carpet) by Phú Luân	Drama	Produced in 2014.
11 Sep-20 Oct	Hoa hồng mua chịu (Roses Bought on Credit)	30	World Star Group	Vũ Xuân Hưng (director); Tống Phương Dung, Nguyễn Ngân Hà (writers); Thu Quỳnh, Vũ Phan Anh, Minh Tiệp, Hồng Quang, Đàm Hằng, Thanh Chi, Lan Hương 'Bông', Ngọc Bích, Vân Navy, Đinh Hoàng Yến, Hữu Phương, Diệp Bích, Thùy Dương, Quân Anh, Thu Trang, Trần Huy Toàn, An Linh...	Ngày nắng mới (Brand New Sunshine Day) by Lê Minh Trung; Nụ hồng cho em (Rosebud For You) by Mandy Thanh Trúc	Drama	Produced in 2012-2013.
23 Oct-4 Dec	Nấc thang lửa (Fiery Step)	30	VTV and VFS	Nguyễn Anh Tuấn (director); Đỗ Thị Thanh Hương (writer); Kim Va, Kha Ly, Quang Thảo, Văn Tiến Luật, Phương Hằng, Văn Anh...	Hãy về với em (Delicate Dream) by Tuyết Mai	Drama	Produced in 2012.
5 Dec 2017- 2 Feb 2018	Nhà Voi Còi cuối phố (Scraggy Elephant's House at Street End)	33	Khang Viet Film	Bùi Nam Yên (director); Đinh Thủy, Hà Thu Hà (writers); Mạnh Hùng, Thân Thúy Hà, Nhật Long, Lý Chí Vỹ, Lê Bình, Diễm My, Võ Đình Hiếu, Lê Chi Na, Hồ Thái Huy, Hiền Trang...	Anh không thể ngừng yêu em (I Can't Stop Loving You) by Vũ Quốc Việt Tình cha và con (The Bond of Dad and Son) by Nhật Huy	Drama, Children	Aired 19:00 to 19:45 in 2018 (Ep 16 to end). Followed by new time slot for VN dramas playback. Produced in 2013.

== Non-recurring dramas ==
These dramas was warehoused and now released on VTV channels in the time slot that's originally made for another program or playback dramas.

Broadcast	Title	Eps.	Prod.	Cast and crew	Theme song(s)	Genre	Notes
29 Nov-28 Dec	Đất mơ xanh (Green Farm Dream)	30	V-Art Film	Xuân Phước (director); Tống Phương Chi (writers); Võ Thành Tâm, Trịnh Kim Chi, Thúy Diễm, Công Ninh, Bích Duyên, Huỳnh Anh Tuấn, Uyên Trinh, Thành Chiến, Quang Khải, Thủy Cúc, Hải Lý, Ngọc Xuân, Mỹ Ngọc, Hoàng Mập...	Ước mơ xanh (Green Dreams) by Tâm Linh Chồi xanh (Green Shoots) by Tâm Linh	Drama	Airs from 13:30 to 14:30 on VTV6. Preceded by Người đứng trong gió. Followed by Nữ cảnh sát tập sự. Produced in 2012.
4 Dec 2017- 2 Feb 2018	Cung đường trắng (The White Road)	45	World Star Group	Đỗ Phú Hải, Đặng Minh Quang (directors); Nguyễn Xuân Hải (writer); Lâm Minh Thắng, Lê Bê La, Võ Thành Tâm, Đinh Y Nhung, Công Dũng, Trần Nhượng, Hồng Giang, Mã Trung, Tiết Cương, Võ Hiệp, Hoàng Nhân, Mai Ngọc Căn, Phạm Hồng, Nhan Sỹ Toàn, Vân Anh, Nguyễn Thu Hà, Ngọc Tản, Thanh Hiền...	Anh sẽ về (He Will Come Back) by Hồng Ngọc; Bước chân các anh (Their Steps) by Việt Danh	Crime, Drama	Airs from 08:30 to 09:15 on VTV3. The time slot is not originally for dramas. Produced in 2014.
4 Dec 2017- 26 Jan 2018	Làm chồng đại gia (Living with a Rich Wife)	40	Đông A Pictures	Danh Sơn, Trần Lực (directors); Giáp Kiều Hưng, Trịnh Đan Phượng (writers); Thúy Hằng, Tiến Lộc, Hải Anh, Lê Phương Anh, Lan Hương 'Bông', Thanh Quý, Văn Báu, Phương Hạnh, Đỗ Duy Nam, Mai Chi, Thanh Hoài, Văn Lượng, Quang Minh, Mỹ Linh...	Yêu thật lòng (Truly Love) & Đừng buông tay (Don't Let Go) by Lê Việt Anh	Drama, Marriage	Airs from 13:45 to 14:30 on VTV3. Preceded by Những người nhiều chuyện. Followed by Cầu vồng tình yêu (2011). Produced in 2013.
4 Dec 2017- 30 Jan 2018	Ranh giới thiện ác (The Boundary between Evil and Good)	59; Original: 48	Thiên Nam An	Đặng Minh Quang (director); Lê Kỳ Nam (writer); Cao Thùy Dương, Võ Thành Tâm, Lâm Minh Thắng, Lê Bê La, Mai Phương, Mai Sơn Lâm, Kim Phượng, Huy Cường, Đức Hải, Thuỷ Cúc, Lê Quang, Kim Huyền, Tấn Thi, Hồ Kim Chi…	Thiên thần lạc lối (Lost Angel) by Phương Thảo	Drama	Airs from 19:00 to 19:30 on VTV8. Ep1-28 (45') and ep29-end (30'). Produced in 2014.

== See also ==
- List of dramas broadcast by Vietnam Television (VTV)
- List of dramas broadcast by Hanoi Radio Television (HanoiTV)
- List of dramas broadcast by Vietnam Digital Television (VTC)
