= List of dramas broadcast by Vietnam Digital Television (VTC) =

This is a list of dramas released by VTC Digital Television.

== #B ==
Broadcast	Title	Eps.	Prod.	Cast and crew	Theme song(s)	Genre	Notes
2008	Bão khô (Dry Storm)	4 (55′)		Trần Vịnh (director); Hà Anh Thu (writer); Phan Hòa, Nguyễn Mạnh Cường, Lan Hương 'Bông, Đinh Thanh Hà, Hoàng Mai, Chí Công, Huyền Thanh, Anh Cường, Công Lý...	Bão khô (Dry Storm) by Việt Hoàn	Drama, Romance	
2010-2011; VTC HD1	Bão trong im lặng (Storm in the Silence)	36 (50′); Pt.1: 18e Pt.2: 18e		Hoàng Thanh Du (director); Đặng Trung, Đỗ Diệp Khang (writers); An Ninh, Thương Huyền, Ngọc Bảo, Đào Hoàng Yến, Thanh Dương, Kỳ Hương, Bùi Xuân Thảo, Xuân Quyết, Phú Sĩ, Lê Nga, Hoàng Thanh Du, Bích Nguyệt, Ngọc Anh, Kiều Vân, Đình Khanh, Lương Hải Khoa, Thanh Liêm, Thế Anh, Văn Quyền, Ngọc Trân, Trần Anh, Minh Bá, Việt Toàn, Duy Linh, Kim Chung...	Chiến sĩ tàu SAR (Soldiers on SAR ship) by the choir	Drama, Action, Crime	
2019; 5-9 Feb; 12:00 VTC1 & VOV; Vietnam Journey	Bến bờ yêu thương (The Dock of Love)	5 (50′)	AHD, VFS & VOV	Trần Chí Thành (director); Đặng Thanh (writer); Bùi Bài Bình, Minh Đức, Anh Đức, Hoàng Anh, Thùy Trang, Phi Huyền Trang, Bảo Trung, Huyền Mỹ, Duy Anh...	Bến bờ yêu thương (The Dock of Love) by Duyên Quỳnh	Family, Romance, Drama	Airs from 1st to 5th Tet Holiday

== #C ==
Broadcast	Title	Eps.	Prod.	Cast and crew	Theme song(s)	Genre	Notes
2009; Mar-Apr; 12:00 Daily; VTC9 Let's Viet	Chàng rể họ Lê (Sons-in-Law Story)	35 (50′)	Lasta Film	Lê Quang Hưng (director); Phạm Thu An, Trịnh Cẩm Hằng, Giáp Kiều Hưng, Trịnh Đan Phượng (writers); Văn Toản, Tuyết Mai, Sĩ Tiến, Lệ Hằng, Chí Trung, Ngọc Huyền, Hữu Phương, Lã Thanh Huyền, Xuân Tùng, Thu Hạnh, Khánh Chi, Kimmese, Phương Oanh, Kim Xuyến, Kim Thoa, Phạm Anh Dũng, Trà My, Ngọc Tuấn, Ngọc Tuyết, Thành An, Tuấn Phương, Minh Nguyệt, Mỹ Hạnh, Vân Anh, Trọng Nguyên, Huyền Thanh...	'Chàng rể họ Lê' theme song by Đức Hải	Family, Comedy, Romance	
2011	Chỉ là ảo vọng (Just Illusory)	9 (50′)		Hoàng Hà Xa, Trần Thuận Bằng (directors); Thanh Hoàng (writer); Phú Thăng, Kim Thoa, Lương Hải Khoa, Bùi Xuân Thảo, Phương Hạnh, Phương Thúy, Thanh Dương, Phạm Văn Tôn, Oai Hùng, Thu Hiền, Minh Nguyệt, Xuân Quyết, Bích Ngọc, Lưu Kỳ Hương...	Thôi đừng chiêm bao (No Longer Dream) by Lệ Quyên	Drama	
2010; Jun-Jul; 12:00/20:30 Sun; VTC HD VIP 1	Có lẽ bởi vì yêu (Perhaps It's Love)	17 (45′)	VTC & Khải Hưng Film	Nguyễn Khải Anh (director); Vũ Nguyệt Ánh (writer); Duy Khoa, Thanh Huyền, Phan Anh, Trang Pháp, Hồng Sơn, Hồng Liên, Anh Dũng, Thanh Tùng, Anh Vũ, Tùng Anh, Đức Anh, Thanh Thúy, Ngọc Anh, Mai Vy, Thu Hà, Thanh Thủy, Trí Hiếu, Minh Nguyệt, Ngọc Mai, Kim Ngọc, Ngọc Tuyết, Thu Chanh, Phương Ngọc, Xuân Phương, Mạnh Quân, Minh Đạt, Tiến Lực, Đức Hùng, Bùi Quang, Thu Sen, Thu Huyền...	Bản tình ca đầu tiên (The First Love Song) & Thầm yêu (Crush) by Duy Khoa; Bài ca tình yêu (Song of Love) by Thùy Chi; Có lẽ bởi vì yêu (Perhaps It's Love) by Trang Pháp	Romance, Drama	First drama with HD Technology
2008; Nov-Dec; VTC9 Let's Viet	Con đường hạnh phúc (The Road of Happiness)	37 (50′)	Lasta Film	Bùi Huy Thuần (director); Trịnh Khánh Hà, Nguyễn Thị Hồng Vân, Lại Minh Nguyệt, Trần Thị Thanh Thủy (writers); Diệu Hương, Danh Tùng, Lan Hương 'Bông', Anh Dũng, Minh Hòa, Hoàng Dũng, Việt Thắng, Hồng Lê, Thanh Hải, Tạ Tuấn Minh, Phương Thảo, Đức Khuê, Minh Cúc, Đức Kiên, Thu Hà, Tuấn Quang, Công Dũng, Tiến Minh, Tùng Dương, Đào Hoàng Yến...	Con đường hạnh phúc (The Road of Happiness) by Thùy Chi	Romance, Drama	

== #Đ ==
Broadcast	Title	Eps.	Prod.	Cast and crew	Theme song(s)	Genre	Notes
2007; 4 Mar-1 Apr; Cinema for Youth; VTC1	Đám cưới ở thiên đường (Wedding in Paradise)	5	Cinema For Saturday Afternoon Center	Bùi Tuấn Dũng (director); Đặng Thu Hà (writer); Linh Nga, Văn Bích, Yjack, Thanh Mai, Phan Anh, Minh Châu, Thanh Hiền...	Về đi em (Come Back, Darling) by Trần Tiến	Romance, Drama, Family	
2010	Để gió cuốn đi (Let the Wind Blow)	26 (50')	VTC & Khải Hưng Film	Nguyễn Mai Hiền (director); Đỗ Trí Hùng (writer); Hồng Nhung, Mạnh Quân, Tiến Thành, Bảo Yến, Bảo Anh, Bình Xuyên, Thanh Quý, Trần Bích, Cường Việt, Mạnh Hưng, Pha Lê...	Để gió cuốn đi (Let the Wind Blow) by Tiến Minh	Drama, Romance	
2008; VTC1	Đội văn nghệ cụm dân cư số 6 (Performance Team of Residential Area No.6)			Phạm Hoàng Hà (director); Bảo Anh, Mẫn Đức Kiên...		Romance, Comedy, Musical	

== #H ==
Broadcast	Title	Eps.	Prod.	Cast and crew	Theme song(s)	Genre	Notes
2010; 1-2-3 Oct; 21:00 VTC HD VIP 3	Hà Nội một thời (A Time in Hanoi)	3 (60′)	VTC & Khải Hưng Film	Bạch Diệp (director); Trịnh Thanh Nhã (writer); Dũng Nhi, Phạm Cường, Thanh Quý, Tiến Đạt, Lan Hương 'Bông', Bình Xuyên, Bảo Anh, Thu Hiền, Lâm Tùng, Thanh Hương, Bùi Kiều, Như Quỳnh, Văn Huy, Lệ Mỹ, Đại Mý, Quang Vịnh, Ngọc Minh...		Drama, Slice-of-Life, Period	Celebrating 1000 Years of Thăng Long - Hà Nội
2011	Hạnh phúc nhọc nhằn (Fatigued Happiness)	27 (50′)	VTC & Khải Hưng Film	Nguyễn Khải Anh (director); Đỗ Trí Hùng (writer); Lâm Tùng, Phạm Cường, Đỗ Quỳnh Hoa, Ngọc Quỳnh, Phương Khanh, Khôi Nguyên, Tuyết Liên, Thùy Liên, Thanh Huyền, Mạnh Hà, Thanh Thúy, Hồng Thái, Thu Nga, Khả Sinh, Lưu Đê Ly, Thu Hoài, Hải Anh, Hoàng Tùng, Quốc Việt, Tạ Am, Lưu Ly...	'Hạnh phúc nhọc nhằn' theme song Composed by Xuân Phương	Drama, Marriage, Romance	
2018; 22 Sep-19 Nov; 20:00 Sat-Sun-Mon; VTC3 On Sports	Hậu duệ mặt trời (Descendants of the Sun Vietnam)	48 (22′)	BHD, Keeng Movies & DANET Original	Trần Bửu Lộc (director); Như Huỳnh, Dracovo (writers); Song Luân, Khả Ngân, Hữu Vi, Cao Thái Hà, Kiến An, Thùy Dương, Ngọc Tưởng, Trần Phong, Nguyễn Hoài Ân, Liên Bỉnh Phát, Đinh Minh Quân, Lâm Trí, Mạnh Hùng, Trúc Mây, Đình Hiếu, Him Phạm, Trường Dân, Hoàng Nam, Quốc Hùng, Trần Kim Lợi, Quang Trung, Hoàng Thanh...	Bên em là anh (I'll Always Be With You) by Nguyên Hà & Song Luân Yêu xa (Love with Long Distance) by Song Luân Nếu có thể được yêu (If Love Is Possible) by Lynk Lee	Romance, Action, Drama	Airs 2 eps per night. Released earlier on DANET online film service. Based on K-drama of the same name (KBS 2016)
2007; Cinema for Youth; VTC1	Hậu họa (Disastrous Consequences)	25	Cinema For Saturday Afternoon Center	Phạm Nhuệ Giang (director); Nguyễn Mạnh Tuấn (writer); Diệu Hương, Minh Châu, Kiều Thanh, Thanh Hương...	'Hậu họa' theme song	Drama, Family, Marriage	
2008; 22 Jun-6 Jul; Cinema for Youth; VTC1	Hoa đại trắng (White Frangipani)	3 (60′)		Bùi Tuấn Dũng (director); Bùi Thu Hồng (writer); Bảo Yến, Thanh Hưng, Thanh Hiền, Diệu Thuần, Bá Cường, Tuấn Dương, Kim Loan, Thành An, Văn Học, Lưu Thúy Nga, Ngô Thanh Hương, Nguyễn Văn Khung, Nguyễn Hải Hà, Nguyễn Thanh Thúy, Trần Đức Dũng, Thu Hà, Thanh Loan, Vân Dung, Thành Hưng...	Giấc mơ trưa (Noon Dream) by Thùy Chi	Drama, Slice-of-Life, Romance	Based on the true story from the documentary Bức thông điệp dưới tán bồ đề by Bùi Hồng Hà
2009	Hoa trúc đào (Oleander Flower)			Vũ Xuân Hưng (director); Phan Thúy Diệu (writer); Diệu Hương...		Drama, Business, Romance	

== #K ==
Broadcast	Title	Eps.	Prod.	Cast and crew	Theme song(s)	Genre	Notes
2007; 18-25 Feb; Cinema for Youth; VTC1	Khách đến chơi xuân (New Year Visitor)	2 (70′)	Vietnam Cinema Department & VTC	Nguyễn Mạnh Hà (director); Đỗ Hùng Quang (writer); Tiến Mộc, Thùy Liên, Trần Hạnh, Anh Quân, Hà Duy, Linh Chi, Hoàng Mai, Phương Khanh, Xuân Hậu, Xuân Dương...		Drama, Family	Early released on VTV1. First Cinema of Youth drama.

== #N ==
Broadcast	Title	Eps.	Prod.	Cast and crew	Theme song(s)	Genre	Notes
2007; 8 Apr-6 May; Cinema for Youth; VTC1	Ngày đó đến bây giờ (Those to These Days)	5 (70′)	VFS	Xuân Sơn (director); Lâm Quang Ngọc (writer); Quang Ánh, Thu Nga, Tuấn Dương, Thanh Nhàn, Nông Dũng Nam / Bùi Bài Bình, Lan Hương 'Bông', Đỗ Quỳnh Hoa, Nguyễn Thanh Hiền, Thu Hằng, Trương Quốc Khánh, Cát Trần Tùng, Trịnh Nhật, Hà Văn Trọng, Trần Hạnh, Tạ Minh Thảo, Nguyễn Phong, Huyền Thanh, Thái An, Mạnh Kiểm, Xuân Tiên, Trần Dũng, Quỳnh Trang, Hồng Vân, Huỳnh Phương, Đức Mẫn...	'Ngày đó đến bây giờ' theme song by Nguyễn Ngọc Anh	Drama, Romance, Family, Slice-of-Life	

== #S ==
Broadcast	Title	Eps.	Prod.	Cast and crew	Theme song(s)	Genre	Notes
2012-2013; 18 Dec 2012- 6 Feb 2013; 21:30 Mon to Sat; VTC9 Let's Viet	Siêu thị tình yêu (Love Supermarket)	44 (50′)	Lasta Film	Nguyễn Danh Dũng (director); Giáp Kiều Hưng, Nguyễn Thu Hà, Trịnh Khánh Hà, Nguyễn Thu Thủy (writers); Thành Đạt, Vi Cầm, Diệu Hương, Trung Hiếu, Tiến Đạt, Thanh Quý, Công Lý, Đức Khuê, Lan Anh, Quang Sự, Mạnh Quân, Hồng Lê, Hồng Hạnh...	Nơi tình yêu bắt đầu (Where the Love Begins) by Bằng Kiều & Lam Anh	Romance, Drama	Produced in 2009

== #T ==
Broadcast	Title	Eps.	Prod.	Cast and crew	Theme song(s)	Genre	Notes
2008; 6-11 Feb; VTC1	Tết không chỉ có hoa đào (Tết Is More Than Just Peach Blossoms)	6 (70′)		Bùi Tuấn Dũng (director); Nguyễn Khánh Trà, Đặng Thu Hà, Đoàn Mai Hoa (writers); Lã Thanh Huyền, Thế Hoàng, Mai Hòa, An Ninh, Trịnh Nhật, Quang Huy, Mai Huyền, Diễm Lộc, Văn Học, Kim Thoa, Thành An, Hoàng Anh, Anh Dũng, Minh Huyền, Hán Văn Thân, Hoài Thanh, Thanh Tùng, Lan Minh, Đình Trung, Mỹ Hạnh, Đình Minh, Bích Loan, Văn Cường...	Hẹn ước mùa xuân (Spring Promise) by Maya	Romance, Slice-of-Life, Family	Airs 30th to 5th Tet holiday
2013; 12 Jul-27 Aug; VTC7 TodayTV	Tình như chiếc bóng (Love Is Like a Shadow)	33 (42′)		Nguyễn Tiến Thành (director); Dương Nữ Khánh Thương, Thiên Di (writers); Nguyễn Thu Hà, Quốc Trường, Vân Navy, Quang Sự, Bảo Yến, Trần Đức, Minh Hòa, Minh Khánh, Hồng Lê, Quốc Trị, Đỗ Duy Nam, Lan Anh, Thanh Hiền, Minh Nguyệt, Vân Anh, Tuấn Tài, Tuấn Cường, Thúy Hà, Quốc Đoàn...	Mãi là tình yêu (It's Forever Love) by Minh Vương Bắt bóng tình yêu (To Catch the Shadow of Love) by Tiến Minh & Hà My	Romance, Drama, Business	

== #V ==
Broadcast	Title	Eps.	Prod.	Cast and crew	Theme song(s)	Genre	Notes
2011; 2-7 Feb	Về quê đón Tết (To Welcome Tết in the Hometown)	6 (50′)	VTC & Khải Hưng Film	Quỳnh Anh (director); Phạm Ngọc Tiến (writer); Văn Hiệp, Ngô Hồng Thái, Đồng Thanh Bình, Ngọc Hà, Thanh Thúy, Lâm Tùng, Quốc Quân, Tuyết Liên, Tùng Dương, Thanh Nhàn, Lê Quốc Thắng, Xuân Hảo, Đức Nam, Tiến Bỉnh, Tiến Mộc, Đại Mý, Kim Ngọc, Đỗ Hương, Ngọc Hòa, Thanh Hằng, Mai Phương, Minh Hoàng, Thành Trung, Trung Kiên, Tú Anh...		Slice-of-Life, Romance, Drama, Family	Airs 30th to 5th Tet holiday
2019; 5-9 Feb; 19:00 VTC1 & VOV; Vietnam Journey	Vương tơ (Silk Strings Attached)	5 (50′)	VFS & VOV	Nguyễn Đức Việt, Nguyễn Anh Tuấn (directors); Trịnh Thanh Nhã, Lê Anh Thúy (writers); Vĩnh Xương, Minh Phương, Quỳnh Đan, Quang Trọng, Thu Hiền, Thu Hường, Quốc Tuấn, Phú Đôn, Ngọc Tản, Anh Thư, Bùi Sỹ Tự, Văn Tuấn, Phạm Hương, Vi Thường, Phương Tấm, Sùng Lãm, Diệu Hiền, Cường Túc, Trọng Trí, Minh Hiếu, Ngọc Dung, Vũ Hoàn, Hà Phương Thảo, Nguyễn Tất Thanh...	Vương tơ (Silk Strings Attached) by Quang Huy	Family, Drama, Slice-of-Life, Romance	Airs from 1st to 5th Tet Holiday

== See also ==
- List of dramas broadcast by Vietnam Television (VTV)
- List of dramas broadcast by Hanoi Radio Television (HanoiTV)
- List of programmes broadcast by VTC

== Notes ==
- Cinema for Youth (Vietnamese: Điện ảnh Trẻ, later Tạp chí Điện ảnh Trẻ) is a program for young Vietnamese filmmakers and audiences launched on 18 February 2007. The dramas aired from 12:30 to 13:30 every Sunday (moved to 09:30 to 10:30 in 2008) as a part of the program.
- Since 27 June 2015, VTC has become an affiliated units of VOV, until it was shut down on 15 January 2025.
