= List of VTV dramas broadcast in 1994 =

This is a list of VTV dramas released in 1994.

←1982-1993 - 1994 - 1995→

== Vietnamese dramas on VTV1 night time slot ==
VTV1 night time slot during this time comprises the time slot for new dramas (mainly foreign ones) on Wednesday-Friday-Sunday nights and the time slot for Vietnamese feature films playback on Saturday night. There was only one Vietnamese film aired in this time slot in the year and no new Tet drama released.

- Note: There were still several playbacks of Vietnamese feature films or dramas aired on morning or afternoon time slots on VTV1.

Broadcast	Title	Eps.	Prod.	Cast and crew	Theme song(s)	Genre	Notes
12-16 Feb; Sun/Wed	Phía sau cổng trời (Behind the Sky Gate)	2		Thu Quế...		Drama, Ethnic, Crime, Political	Adapted from Ngôn Vĩnh's novel 'Bên kia cổng trời'

== VTV1 Sunday Literature & Art dramas ==
New time slot was created this year as a collaboration between Vietnam Television Audio Visual Center and Film Subcommittee from VTV's Literature & Art Committee.

These dramas air in Sunday afternoon on VTV1 as a part of the program Sunday Literature & Art (Vietnamese: Văn nghệ Chủ Nhật).

- Note: The airtime with an asterisk (*) at the end indicates that the broadcast order is undefined

Broadcast	Title	Eps.	Prod.	Cast and crew	Theme song(s)	Genre	Notes
4-11 Sep	Mẹ chồng tôi (My Mother-in-Law)	2 (85′)	VTV Audio Visual Center	Nguyễn Khải Hưng (director); Vũ Thảo (writer); Thu An, Chiều Xuân, Trần Lực, Thanh Thúy, Văn Hiệp, Tuyết Liên, Phạm Đôn, Phát Triệu, Thanh Bình..	Con đường của mẹ (The Way of Mother); Composed by Vũ Thảo; Performed by Mai Tuyết	Drama, Marriage, Rural, War	Adapted from Nguyễn Minh Chính's short story of the same name
18 Sep	Người tình của cha (Father's Lover)	1	VTV Audio Visual Center	Nguyễn Khải Hưng (director)		Drama, Family	Adapted from Từ Nguyên Tĩnh's short story of the same name
25 Sep	Bản giao hưởng đêm mưa (Rainy Night Symphony)	1	VTV Audio Visual Center	Nguyễn Khải Hưng (director); Đoàn Trúc Quỳnh (writer); Bùi Bài Bình, Chiều Xuân, Diệu Thuần, Trần Quốc Trọng, Thùy Hương, Ngọc Thu, Hoàng Dũng, Kim Xuyến, Hồ Lan...		Drama	
2-9 Oct	Lẽ nào anh lại quên (Maybe You Forgot)	2	VTV Audio Visual Center	Nguyễn Hữu Phần (director); Thu Hiền...		Drama, Romance	
16 Oct-25 Dec*	Cuốn sổ ghi đời (Life Notebook)	2 (75′)	VTV's Literature & Art Committee	Đặng Tất Bình (director); Nguyễn Hữu Luyện (writer); Trần Hạnh, Đặng Tất Bình, Quốc Tuấn, Thúy Phương, Khánh Huyền, Văn Thành, Thu Hương, Trung Hiếu, Công Lý, Thanh Hoài, Hoài Thu, Hoàng Anh Vũ, Lý Bá Vũ, Thu An, Văn Hiệp, Lê Mai, Ngọc Thoa, Hoàng Sơn, Thanh Hải, Lưu Sa An Na, Tuyết Nga, Như Ý, Thanh Hiền, Phạm Tần...		Drama, Family, Slice-of-Life	
16 Oct-25 Dec*	Điệp khúc tình yêu (Chorus of Love)	1	VTV Audio Visual Center	Nguyễn Khải Hưng (director); Tuấn Quang...		Drama, Romance	
16 Oct-25 Dec*	Kiếm sống (Making a Living)	1	VTV Audio Visual Center			Drama, Slice-of-Life	
16 Oct-25 Dec*	Lừ đừ ông từ vào đền (Leaden Like a Temple Guardian)	1	VTV Audio Visual Center			Comedy	
16 Oct-25 Dec*	Chiếc bình ngọc (The Jade Vase)	1	VTV Audio Visual Center			Drama	
16 Oct-25 Dec*	Sân chơi (Playground)	1	VTV Audio Visual Center			Drama	
16 Oct-25 Dec*	Màu sắc tình yêu (Colour of Love)	1	VTV Audio Visual Center			Drama, Romance	
16 Oct-25 Dec*		3	VTV Audio Visual Center			Drama	

== See also ==
- List of dramas broadcast by Vietnam Television (VTV)
- List of dramas broadcast by Hanoi Radio Television (HanoiTV)
- List of dramas broadcast by Vietnam Digital Television (VTC)
