= List of VTV dramas broadcast in 1996 =

This is a list of VTV dramas released in 1996.

←1995 - 1996 - 1997→

== VTV Tet dramas ==
These films were released on VTV channel during Tet holiday. In this time, all of the channels were merged with a single broadcast schedule.

Broadcast	Title	Eps.	Prod.	Cast and crew	Theme song(s)	Genre	Notes
20 Feb	Cái Tết của lão Bồng (Mr. Bồng's Tết Holiday)	1	VTV Audio Visual Center	Trần Quốc Trọng (director); Mạnh Tuấn...		Comedy	Airs 22:30, 2nd Tet holiday
21 Feb	Khoảng cách (The Distance)	1 (93′)	VTV's Literature & Art Committee	Đặng Lưu Việt Bảo (director); Đoàn Minh Tuấn (writer); Văn Hiệp, Vân Dung, Xuân Tùng, Quang Trung, Khánh Hà, Mạnh Tuấn, Hữu Trọng, Trọng Hà, Việt Hà...		Drama, Romance, Slice-of-Life	Airs 17:20, 3rd Tet holiday. Adapted from Phan Thanh Cải's short story 'Nơi đất trời gặp gỡ'.

== Vietnamese dramas on VTV1 night time slot ==
Several Vietnamese dramas was released on VTV1 night time slot but there was no recurring broadcast schedule. The list below includes all of Vietnamese films and dramas aired in this time slot during the year.

Broadcast	Title	Eps.	Prod.	Cast and crew	Theme song(s)	Genre	Notes
17-19 Jan; Wed-Fri	Chuyện tình người lính (A Soldier's Love Story)	2	VTV's Literature & Art Committee	Vi Hòa (director); Quốc Tuấn...		Drama, Romance	
24-26 Jan; Wed-Fri	Đường băng (Runway)	2 (70′)	VTV's Literature & Art Committee	Hà Lê Sơn (director); Hà Lê Sơn, Nguyễn Sỹ Thành (writers); Thu Thủy, Phương Thanh, Mạnh Cường, Anh Dũng, Thanh Nga, Minh Thu, Tuyết Liên, Tuấn Dũng, Hồng Anh, Tuấn Anh, Thanh Giang, Minh Thọ, Quang Văn...	'Đường băng' theme song by Hương Lan	Drama, Family, Marriage	
29 Jan; Mon	30 năm ấy (Those 30 Years)	1				Drama	
29 Apr; Mon	Followed by the playback of 1976 feature film Cô Nhíp (Ms. Nhíp).						
6 May; Mon	Followed by the playback of the film Nhận Huế làm quê hương (Huế As My Hometown).						
22-29 May; Wed/Wed	Mê lộ (Maze)	2	VTV's Literature & Art Committee	Lê Cường Việt (director); Trung Anh...		Drama, Post-war, Psychological	Adapted from Đỗ Chu's short story of the same name
12 Jun; Wed	Followed by the playback of feature film Cơn lốc biển (The Sea Whirlwind).						
14 Jun; Fri	Followed by the playback of feature film Dòng sông khát vọng (River of Desire).						
19-21 Jun; Wed-Fri	Followed by the playback of Hoa trong bão (Flower in the Storm), 2 episodes. The drama was first released on VTV3 in 1995.						
26 Jun; Wed	Đội du kích Hoàng Ngân (Hoàng Ngân Guerrilla Team)	1	VTV Audio Visual Center	Nguyễn Hữu Phần (director)...		Drama, War, Historical	Adapted from the novel of "Nhãn đầu mùa" by Xuân Tùng & Trần Thanh
28 Jun; Fri	Nguyễn Thị Minh Khai	1 (80′)	VTV Audio Visual Center & Tây Đô Film Prod.	Bạch Diệp (director); Lê Minh (writer); Minh Châu, Trà Giang, Trọng Trinh, Mạnh Dung, Kim Bình, Minh Thủy, Phi Yến, Hữu Tiến, Lê Hóa, Chấn Cường, Hiền Mai, Sơn Hải, Hoàng Thơi, Hùng Phương, Việt Hùng, Robert Hải, Bách Thái, Lê Trí, Nguyễn Thị Năm, Nhật Cường, Đức Hùng, Huy Phước, Duy Bình, Minh Hoàng, Hồng Hiệp, Quốc Tuấn...		Biography, Drama, Historical, War	
3 Jul; Wed	Những cuộc tìm kiếm (The Searches)	1 (84′)	VTV's Literature & Art Committee	Đặng Tất Bình (director); Đỗ Trí Hùng (writer); Phương Thanh, Đặng Tất Bình, Lan Hương, Duy Hậu, Phương Nhung, Hương Dung, Thanh Hiền, Vân Dung, Hồng Hạnh, Hoài Thu, Kim Yến, Anh Tuấn, Minh Bảo, Nguyệt Hằng...		Drama, Marriage, Comedy	
19 Jul; Fri	Trung du (Midlands)	1	VTV's Literature & Art Committee	Trần Phương (director); Đoàn Tuấn (writer); Trung Hiếu, Lê Quang Thanh Tâm...		Drama, Slice-of-Life, Scholastic, Period	
2 Aug; Fri	Cỏ lồng vực (Barnyard Grass)	1 (100′)	VTV's Literature & Art Committee	Vũ Trường Khoa (director); Nguyễn Thị Ngọc Tú (writer); Võ Hoài Nam, Hoàng Lan, Thu Phòng, Quốc Huy, Hằng Nga, Thủy Thủy, Ngọc Tâm, Hồng Điệp, Đình Thắng, Nguyễn Hát, Ngọc Trung, Hồ Thư, Xuân Thức, Lương Hùng, Tuấn Anh, Văn Toàn, Huỳnh Phương, Đức Long, Thành An, Lan Minh...		Drama, Romance	
16 Aug; Fri	Khi người ta yêu (When People Love)	1 (83′)	VTV's Literature & Art Committee	Vũ Minh Trí (director); Đỗ Trí Hùng (writer); Lê Vũ Long, Trần Thu Huyền, Đức Long, Thu Phòng, Mạnh Kiểm, Tuyết Liên, Kim Chi, Phú Thăng, Quốc Trị, Trần Tuấn, Anh Phương, Thùy Chi, Quỳnh Lan, Ngọc Quân, Hương Dung, Phương Tâm, Quang Anh, Thanh Đức...		Romance, Drama	
19-21 Aug; Mon-Fri	Biến động ngày hè (Summer Day Upheaval)	2	Tây Đô Film Prod.	Yên Sơn (director); Quyền Linh, Thanh Điền...		Drama, Crime, Political, Period	Based on theatrical script of the same name by Lê Tri Kỷ
2 Sep; Mon	Sinh ngày 2-9 (Born on the 2nd of September)	1 (60′)	VTV Audio Visual Center	Nguyễn Khải Hưng (director); Lê Phương, Trịnh Thanh Nhã (writers); Quốc Toàn, Dũng Nhi, Kim Nhung, Hoàng Cúc, Thu Hiền, Xuân Huyền, Lê Liên, Hoàng Yến, Văn Kha, Thanh Thùy, Vũ Tăng, Thu Hương, Diễm Lộc, Thanh Bình, Mỹ Huyền...	'Sinh ngày 2-9' theme song Composed by Vũ Thảo	Drama, Slice-of-Life, Family	Produced to celebrate the National Day
20 Sep; Fri	Lúa thì con gái (Adolescent Rice)	1 (100′)	VTV's Literature & Art Committee	Vi Hòa (director); Trịnh Thanh Nhã (writer); Quốc Trị, Thái An, Ngọc Dung, Duy Hậu, Phạm Cường, Huy Công, Thu Hương, Tuấn Dũng, Khương Duy, Văn Toản, Lệ Thanh...		Family, Drama, Rural	
27 Sep; Fri	Trả giá (To Pay the Dues)	1 (93′)	VTV's Literature & Art Committee	Đặng Tất Bình (director); Đỗ Trí Hùng (writer); Lan Hương, Văn Thành, Duy Thanh, Trọng Phan, Bích Thủy, Thanh Hiền, Quốc Khánh...		Drama, Marriage	
4 Oct; Fri	U tôi (My Mother)	1		Lê Công Tuấn Anh, Vĩnh Xương...		Drama, Family, Rural	

=== Unstable time slot on Wednesday night ===
Since late 1996, Vietnamese dramas tend to be aired on Wednesday night more often. This continues to the next year.

Broadcast	Title	Eps.	Prod.	Cast and crew	Theme song(s)	Genre	Notes
23-30 Oct; Wed/Wed	Tình biển (Ocean Love)	2	VTV's Literature & Art Committee and KGTV	Yên Sơn (director); Đặng Tất Bình, Yên Sơn (writers); Lan Hương, Lê Công Tuấn Anh, Minh Khánh, Quyền Linh, Thiên Bảo, Trịnh Kim Chi, Mã Đức, Phương Tùng, Xuân Chọn, Hồng Nga, Kim Liên, Xuân On, Thanh Tâm...		Drama, Romance, Slice-of-Life	Adapted from Anh Đào's short novel 'Rong biển'
20 Nov-14 Dec; Wed/Wed/Wed/ Wed-Sat	Ảo ảnh trắng (White Illusion)	5	VTV Film Prod.	Nguyễn Khải Hưng, Đặng Lưu Việt Bảo (directors); Nguyễn Thị Ngọc Tú (writer); Bùi Bài Bình, Lan Hương 'Bông', Thu An, Trung Anh, Minh Hằng, Phú Thăng, Mạnh Tuấn, Nguyệt Hằng, Đức Hải, Hoàng Lâm, Minh Vượng, Phú Đôn, Đình Chiến, Ngọc Thư, Thu Hiền, Văn Báu, Ngọc Dũng, Nguyễn Minh Hiệu, Lê Trực Dũng, Nguyễn Thế Anh, Lê Ngân, Hồ Văn Nam, Cao Thị Ngọc Bách, Văn Trường...		Drama, Medical, Slice-of-Life	Final episode airs on Sat, 14 Dec. Adapted from Nguyễn Thị Ngọc Tú's novel of the same name.
18 Dec; Wed	Những người ở hậu phương (People in the Rear)	1	VTV's Literature & Art Committee	Trọng Liên (director)		Drama, War	
29 Dec; Sun	Followed by the playback of feature film Bụi hồng (Gone, Gone Forever Gone). The movie was released 4 months ago.						

== VTV3 Sunday Literature & Art dramas ==
These dramas air in early Sunday afternoon as a part of the program Sunday Literature & Art (Vietnamese: Văn nghệ Chủ Nhật).

Starting from March 31, the program was moved from VTV1 to VTV3 as soon as the latter channel was officially launched.

- Note: The airtime with an asterisk (*) at the end indicates that the broadcast order is undefined

Broadcast	Title	Eps.	Prod.	Cast and crew	Theme song(s)	Genre	Notes
7-21 Jan	Ngày trở về (Returning Day)	3	VTV Audio Visual Center	Trần Phương (director); Vũ Thảo (writer); Hoàng Lan, Quyền Linh, Quang Huy, Trần Hạnh, Mai Châu, Lan Hương 'Bông', Ánh Tuyết, Thanh Giang, Phương Nhi, Đỗ Lan Hương, Thanh Yến, Lệ Hằng, Quốc Giới, Thúy Mận, Trọng Bằng...		Romance, Post-war, Drama	
28 Jan-11 Feb	Những người con của biển (Children of the Sea)	3	VTV Audio Visual Center	Đặng Tất Bình (director); Trọng Trinh, Quang Thắng...	Biển chiều (At Sea an Afternoon) by Thu Phương	Drama	Each episode has its own name with an independent story
18 Feb	Chuyện tình bên sông Đáy (Love Story By Đáy River)	1	VTV Audio Visual Center			Romance, Drama	
25 Feb-24 Mar	Những người sống bên tôi - Phần 2 (People Around Me - Part 2)	5 (70′)	VTV Audio Visual Center	Đặng Tất Bình (director); Nguyễn Khải Hưng, Vũ Thảo (writers); Quốc Tuấn, Lan Hương, Nguyệt Hằng, Đặng Tất Bình, Mạnh Linh, Lê Mai, Đức Trung, Huệ Đàn, Thu Hải, Văn Thành, Hoàng Dũng, Đỗ Kỷ, Minh Hằng, Thanh Chi, Lan Hương 'Bông', Ngọc Quốc, Đình Chiến, Thúy Phương, Hữu Độ, Tuyết Mai, Ngọc Thoa, Văn Toản, Tiến Đạt, Trung Hiếu, Anh Tuấn, Hồng Minh...		Drama, Slice-of-Life, Marriage	Following up Những người sống bên tôi (1995)
31 Mar-7 Apr	Đông Ki ra thành phố (Don Quixote to the city)	2 (75′)	VTV's Literature & Art Committee	Lê Đức Tiến (director); Đoàn Trúc Quỳnh, Trần Vịnh, Đỗ Bảo Châu (writers); Trịnh Thịnh, Văn Hiệp, Trần Hạnh, Tuyết Liên, Kim Xuyến, Ngọc Lan, Thu Hà, Xuân Thức, Phạm Bằng, Chí Trung, Trần Nhượng, Nhật Đức, Chu Hùng, Tuyết Mai, Văn Khôi, Minh Kết, Vũ Tăng, Bá Anh, Quốc Khánh, Mạnh Tuấn, Lê Chân, Xuân Tần, Việt Yên, Minh Gái, Danh Thái, Hoàng Khánh...		Comedy, Rural	
14 Apr-5 May	Cô gái mang tên dòng sông (The Girl Named After a River)	4	VTV Audio Visual Center	Nguyễn Quang Vinh (writer); Hoàng Lan, Thu Quế, Tùng Dương...		Drama, Rural, Post-war	
12 May-30 Jun	Người Hà Nội (Hanoi People)	8 (70′)	VTV Audio Visual Center	Hoàng Tích Chỉ, Đoàn Lê (directors); Lịch Du (writer); Lê Khanh, Hồng Sơn, Quyền Linh, Minh Hằng, Thu Hiền, Huệ Đàn, Mạnh Cường, Mạnh Linh, Mai Châu, Đới Lan Anh, Quốc Trị, Diệu Thuần, Ngọc Thu, Anh Dũng, Hồng Minh, Minh Tâm, Đăng Khoa, Thanh Quý, Xuân Tùng, Chiều Xuân, Dương Quảng, Đoàn Ngọc, Phương Nhi, Thái Đào, Bích Ngọc, Hồng Phượng, Đức Thành, Valerie, Ciril, Hoàng Thắng, Hoàng Hà...	Chị tôi (My Elder Sister) by Mỹ Linh	Drama, Post-war, Marriage, Family	Adapted from Chu Lai's novel 'Phố'
7 Jul-29 Sep*	Quá khứ không dịu êm (The Past That's Not Mellow)	2 (80′)	VTV Audio Visual Center	Lê Đức Tiến (director); Lê Ngọc Minh (writer); Quang Hải, Thu Phương, Xuân Tùng, Nguyễn Bá Cường, Hoàng Sơn, Kim Thanh, Thu Hương, Minh Huệ, Vũ Phạm Từ, Bùi Bài Bình...		Drama, Post-war, Scholastic	Adapted from story of 'Bản tình ca nghiệt ngã'
7 Jul-29 Sep*	Tình mãi còn xanh (Love Stays Green)	1 (70′)	VTV Audio Visual Center	Cao Mạnh (director); Mạc Văn Chung (writer); Hương Ly, Hoàng Tuấn, Lê Chức, Tuyết Mai, Kim Xuyến, Tuyết Liên, Tuấn Quang, Lã Tam Dương, Đình Chiến, Sao Mai band & Sunday Literature & Art Club	Tình mãi còn xanh (Love Stays Green) & Lời hát dưới mưa (Singing Under the Rain) by Anh Quân	Romance, Drama, Musical	
7 Jul-29 Sep*	Giữa anh là hai người đàn bà (Between You Is Two Women)	2	VTV Audio Visual Center	Bạch Diệp (director); Thanh Tâm (writer); Quốc Tuấn, Hằng Nga, Minh Phương, Hồng Quang, Ngọc Hà, Lệ Hằng, Thanh Du, Mạnh Hùng, Phát Triệu, Tuyết Mai, Quốc Toàn, Hạc Đinh, Kim Xuyến, Khôi Nguyên, Chu Hùng, Phú Thắng, Tuấn Anh, Thu Hường, Thu Hạnh, Minh Châu, Phương Nga, Trịnh Mai Nguyên...		Drama, Romance	Adapted from Bùi Việt Sỹ's novel of the same name
7 Jul-29 Sep*	Điện thoại đồ chơi (Toy Phone)	1	VTV Audio Visual Center	Phạm Thanh Phong (director & writer)		Drama	
7 Jul-29 Sep*	Vàng sa khoáng (Placer Gold)	2	VTV Audio Visual Center	Nguyễn Thế Hồng (director); Lê Ngọc Linh (writer); Quang Thiện, Tuyết Mai, Phát Triệu, Đỗ Kỷ, Minh Hiếu, Trang Phương, Kim Thúy, Bích Ngọc...		Drama	
7 Jul-29 Sep*	Bến cò sông vạc (Stork Wharf, Bittern River)	1	VTV Audio Visual Center	Bạch Diệp, Trọng Liên (directors); Hồng Quang...		Drama	
7 Jul-29 Sep*	Suối ngàn lau chảy mãi (Forever Flowing)	2 (65′)	VTV Audio Visual Center	Nguyễn Hinh Anh (director); Nguyễn Quang Vinh (writer); Thanh Quý, Diệu Thuần, Thu Hải, Hán Văn Tình, Đỗ Kỷ, Bùi Bài Bình, Tùng Dương, Diệu Thùy, Xuân Thức...		Drama	Adapted from Ngô Quang Hưng's novel "Tuần Trăng Mật Cuối Cùng"
7 Jul-29 Sep*	Bà nội (Grandmother)	1	VTV Audio Visual Center			Drama, Family, Slice-of-Life	
7 Jul-29 Sep*	Nửa phần còn lại (The Other Half)	1	VTV's Literature & Art Committee	Đặng Tất Bình (director)...		Drama, Post-war	
6-20 Oct	Ngọt ngào và man trá (Sweet and Falsehoods)	3 (75′)	VTV Audio Visual Center	Nguyễn Hữu Phần, Phi Tiến Sơn (directors); Nguyễn Thế Long (writer); Lê Công Tuấn Anh, Khánh Huyền, Ngọc Thư, Đức Sơn, Thúy Vinh, Hữu Độ, Hồng Hạnh, Trung Hiếu, Tuyết Mai, Phát Triệu, Văn Hiệp, Đặng Tất Bình, Duy Thanh, Thu Hiền, Duy Hậu, Hoàng Thắng, Minh Tuấn, Vĩnh Xương, Thu Hạnh, Trịnh Mai Nguyên, Thu Hương, Hữu Tùng, Vân Dung, Vũ Hạnh, Anh Thơ, Quốc Khánh, Thanh Bình, Thu Thủy, Huỳnh Phương, Bá Anh, Hằng Nga, Vân Anh, Thanh Vân, Ngọc Anh...	'Ngọt ngào và man trá' theme song Female version for episodes 1-2; Male version for episode 3	Romance, Drama	
27 Oct	Mùa chim ngói bay về (Season When Turtle-Doves Fly Back)	1	VTV Audio Visual Center			Drama, Rural, Post-war, Political	Adapted from Hà Nguyên Huyến's short story of the same name
3-17 Nov*	Giấc mộng không thành (Unfulfilled Dream)	1	VTV Audio Visual Center	Bùi Cường (director)		Drama	
3-17 Nov*	Phiên tòa tình yêu (The Trial of Love)	2	VTV Audio Visual Center	Nguyễn Anh Tuấn (director & writer); Mai Thu Nga, Tuấn Quang, Trần Thạch, Thu Hương, Vũ Ngọc Tú, Phạm Ngọc Anh, Hoàng Anh Tuấn, Quách Văn Lịch, Hoàng Trọng Luân...		Drama, Romance	Adapted from Ngô Quang Hưng's novel 'Chuyện tình bà chánh án'
24 Nov	Chuyện không đăng báo (Story That's Not On The News)	1 (80′)	VTV Audio Visual Center	Nguyễn Hữu Tuấn (director); Nguyễn Thế Long (writer); Như Quỳnh, Dũng Nhi, Chí Trung, Minh Hằng, Trang Thanh, Minh Hiếu, Hằng Nga, Thu Phòng, Anh Thơ, Thanh Thủy, Quốc Trị, Phương Tâm, Thùy Chi, Đạo Nghĩa, Ngọc Anh, Tiến Mộc...		Drama, Political	Adapted from Thái Bá Tân's short story 'Nếu giờ này còn sống chị ở đâu'
1 Dec	Chú chó cảnh (The Pet Dog)	1	VTV Audio Visual Center			Drama	
8-29 Dec*	Vào đời (Coming to Life)	3	VTV Audio Visual Center	Bùi Cường (director); Nguyễn Quang Vinh (writer); Hoàng Thu Hường...		Drama	
8-29 Dec*	Đêm trắng (Sleepless Night)	1 (70′)	VTV Film Prod.	Bạch Diệp (director); Phạm Dương Hải, Nguyễn Anh Dũng (writers); Ngọc Lan, Trang Phượng, Thanh Tú, Thu Hương, Trần Hạnh, Minh Quân, Dương Quảng, Hoàng Dũng, Hoàng Sơn, Minh Phương, Phú Thăng, Ngọc Bích, Ngọc Anh, Thu Thủy, Vũ Tăng, Huệ Hát, Huỳnh Phương...		Drama, Historical, War	To celebrate National Resistance Day.

== See also ==
- List of dramas broadcast by Vietnam Television (VTV)
- List of dramas broadcast by Hanoi Radio Television (HanoiTV)
- List of dramas broadcast by Vietnam Digital Television (VTC)
