= List of VTV dramas broadcast in 1995 =

This is a list of VTV dramas released in 1995.

←1994 - 1995 - 1996→

== VTV Tet dramas ==
These films were released on VTV channel during Tet holiday. In this time, all of the channels were merged with a single broadcast schedule. The playbacks of movies or dramas were not included.

Broadcast	Title	Eps.	Prod.	Cast and crew	Theme song(s)	Genre	Notes
31 Jan	Những mảnh vỡ hoàn hảo (Perfect Fragments)	1	VTV Audio Visual Center	Bùi Thạc Chuyên (director); Minh Hằng...		Comedy, Marriage	Airs 08:10, 1st Tet holiday
1 Feb	Đi bầu Thành hoàng (To Elect the Tutelary God)	1	VTV Audio Visual Center	Đỗ Minh Tuấn (director); Lê Ngọc Minh (writer); Trịnh Thịnh, Hoàng Sơn...		Rural, Comedy, Slice-of-Life	Airs 21:15, 2nd Tet holiday. Adapted from Lê Ngọc Minh's short story of the same name.

== Vietnamese dramas on VTV1 night time slot ==
VTV1 night time slot during this time comprises the time slot for new dramas on Wednesday-Friday-Sunday nights and the time slot for Vietnamese feature films playback on Saturday night. The list below includes all of Vietnamese films and dramas aired in Wed-Fri-Sun time slot. Several films was aired on Monday, Tuesday or Thursday in special occasions.

Broadcast	Title	Eps.	Prod.	Cast and crew	Theme song(s)	Genre	Notes
8 Feb; Wed	Followed by the playback of Như một huyền thoại (Like a Legend). The single-episode drama was first released on HTV7 earlier in 1995.						
10 Feb; Fri	Vòng hoa Chom Pây (Chompay Wreath)	1 (85′)	Tây Đô Film Prod.	Đinh Anh Dũng, Hoàng Dũ (directors); Lương Minh Hinh (writer); Lê Công Tuấn Anh, Thanh Mai, Võ Thế Vỹ, Thanh Quý, Trịnh Huệ, Mai Thành, Kim Thùy Chanđa, Minh Ngọc, Trần Vịnh, Mai Thanh Dung, Sơn Thê, Quang Đạt, Cao Lâm Hùng, Nguyễn Văn Bẽn, Lâm Thị Sala, Thạch Thị Liên, Kim Thị Hoi, Lâm Thị Phượng, Thạch Thị Giỏi, Thạch Môni, Ngọc Luân...		Drama, Romance, Ethnic	
19-28 Apr; Wed-Fri/Wed-Fri	Followed by the playback of 4-parts feature film franchise Biệt động Sài Gòn (Saigon Rangers). The films was released in 1986.						
19 Oct; Thu	Followed by the playback of feature film Người con gái Đất Đỏ (Daughter of the Red Land). The film was released earlier in 1995.						
13-22 Dec; Wed-Fri/Wed-Fri	Ông cố vấn (The Advisor)	Episode 1 to Episode 5 (45′)	Vivafilm	Lê Dân (director); Hữu Mai (writer); Vũ Đình Thân, Nguyễn Bá Phong, Nguyễn Bá Lộc, Minh Hòa, Thành Trí, Nguyễn Hậu, Thanh Mai, Hà Phạm Phú, Hồng Lực, Hồng Khắc Đào, Thanh Tú...	'Ông cố vấn' theme song Composed by Phú Quang	Intelligence, Drama, Period, Political	To be continued. Ep 4-5 air back-to-back on 22 Dec. Adapted from Volume 1 of Hữu Mai's novel 'Ông cố vấn: Hồ sơ một điệp viên'.

== VTV1 Sunday Literature & Art dramas ==
These dramas air in Sunday afternoon on VTV1 as a part of the program Sunday Literature & Art (Vietnamese: Văn nghệ Chủ Nhật).

- Note: The issue on 19 Feb was released without the drama.

Broadcast	Title	Eps.	Prod.	Cast and crew	Theme song(s)	Genre	Notes
1-22 Jan	Phải chăng đó là tình yêu? (By Any Chance That Is Love?)	4	VTV Audio Visual Center	Minh Hằng...		Drama, Romance	
29 Jan	Nỗi đau thầm lặng (Silent Pain)	1	VTV's Literature & Art Committee	Đức Hoàn (director); Mai Thu Huyền, Phạm Cường, Tiến Quang...		Drama, War	
5-12 Feb	Tiếng chim thổ đồng (The Bird Sound Resonating in Bass)	2	VTV's Literature & Art Committee			Drama	
26 Feb-26 Mar	Những người sống bên tôi (People Around Me)	5 (70′)	VTV Audio Visual Center	Đặng Tất Bình (director); Nguyễn Khải Hưng (writer); Quốc Tuấn, Lan Hương, Nguyệt Hằng, Mạnh Linh, Lê Mai, Đức Trung, Duy Hậu, Thanh Nga, Trần Hạnh, Ngọc Thoa, Thanh Hiền, Ngọc Quốc, Trung Anh, Hồng Hạnh, Kim Oanh, Như Ý, Công Lý, Mỹ Hạnh, Thái Ninh, Minh Hằng, Thu Hương, Văn Quý, Lương Hữu Đại, Liên Hương, Hoàng Phương...	'Những người sống bên tôi' theme song Composed by Tuấn Phương	Drama, Slice-of-Life, Romance	Produced in 1993-1994
2 Apr	Followed by the playback of Bản giao hưởng đêm mưa (Symphony of the Rainy Night). The single-episode drama was first released also in Sunday Literature & Art in 1994.						
9-16 Apr	Nước mắt đàn bà (Women's Tears)	2	VTV's Literature & Art Committee	Trọng Liên (director); Trịnh Thanh Nhã (writer); Ngọc Thu, Trần Hạnh, Ngọc Thoa, Chiều Xuân, Hồng Diệp, Ngọc Tuyết, Phát Triệu, Đỗ Kỷ, Nguyễn Thị Quý, Lê Ngọc Hương, Phùng Thị Hợi, Minh Tuấn, Tuyết Liên, Thanh Tuấn, Hương Anh, Hạnh Đạt, Thành An...		Drama	a.k.a. Nước mắt trời cho
23 Apr	Hành trình của cha và con (Journey of the Father and His Child)	1	VTV's Literature & Art Committee			Drama	
30 Apr	Câu chuyện 20 năm (20 Years Story)	1	VTV Audio Visual Center	Mạc Văn Chung (director); Lê Phương (writer); Mạnh Lịch, Đặng Tất Bình, Ngọc Thoa, Công Lý, Thanh Thủy, Hồng Đức, Minh Tâm...		Drama, War	Adapted from Lê Văn Thảo's short story of the same name. Celebrating Reunification Day.
7-28 May	Mảnh đời của Huệ (Huệ's Piece of Life)	4 (70′)	VTV Audio Visual Center	Phi Tiến Sơn (director); Nguyễn Hữu Phần (writer); Thu Hiền, Đường Minh Giang, Trần Tường, Hồ Lan, Hoàng Thắng, Lê Thu, Tùng Dương, Kim Xuyến, Văn Hiệp, Hoàng Lâm, Hoàng Nhuận Cầm, Tuyết Hoa, Quốc Phong, Hồ Tháp, Tuyết Liên, Phạm Cường, Thùy Dương, Đức Trung, Vân Anh...	Huệ trắng (White Tuberose) by Tiến Hỷ	Drama, Slice-of-Life, Political	Adapted from Võ Khắc Nghiêm's short story of the same name
4 Jun	Cô bé bên hồ (Little Girl by the Lake)	1	VTV's Literature & Art Committee	Trần Lực (director); Nguyễn Thị Hồng Ngát (writer); Thu Hải, Quốc Tuấn, Hoàng Yến...		Drama, Children	
11 Jun	Người chịu nạn (The Suffered One)	1	VTV Audio Visual Center	Tùng Dương...		Drama	
18 Jun-2 Jul	Trở lại bến xưa (Back to the Old Wharf)	3	VTV Audio Visual Center	Bùi Cường (director); Nguyễn Anh Dũng (writer); Mạnh Cường, Kim Chi, Quốc Khánh, Ngọc Thoa...		Drama, Romance, Rural	
9 Jul	Chiều muộn (Late Afternoon)	1	VTV Audio Visual Center			Drama	
16 Jul	Bầu trời đầy sao (The Sky Full of Stars)	1 (70′)	VTV Audio Visual Center	Hồng Sơn, Thu An, Vũ, Kim Chi, Quốc Trị, Hán Văn Tình...		Drama, Family, Children	
23 Jul	Mẹ Nết (Mother Nết)	1 (70′)	VTV Audio Visual Center	Phạm Thanh Phong (director & writer); Hoàng Yến, Trần Hạnh, An Chinh, Trọng Trinh, Hà Duy, Xuân Thức, Vũ Tăng, Đình Chiến, Thanh Bình...		Drama, War	
30 Jul-6 Aug	Lặng lẽ tuổi trăng tròn (Quietly in Full Moon Age)	2	VTV Audio Visual Center	Bạch Diệp (director & writer); Thùy An, Trọng Trinh, Quế Hằng, Mạnh Linh, Minh Quốc, Lan Hương, Hương Dung, Tuyết Liên...	Lặng lẽ tuổi trăng tròn (Quietly in Full Moon Age) by Lê Dung	Drama, Coming-of-Age	Adapted from Hoàng Ngọc Hà's novel 'Hoa nước mắt'
13 Aug	Giã từ tội lỗi (Farewell to the Sin)	1	VTV Audio Visual Center	Triệu Tuấn (director)		Drama, Slice-of-Life, Crime	
20-27 Aug	Hoa trong bão (Flower in the Storm)	2 (70′)	VTV Audio Visual Center	Bạch Diệp (director); Nguyễn Anh Tuấn (writer); Tiến Hợi, Chí Thông, Công Lý, Hoàng Phương, Huệ Đàn, Trung Anh, Sĩ Toàn, Lan Hương, Minh Hằng, Hart Max, Glen Austin, Kirill Việt, Anh Hùng, Hoàng Dũng, Bình Xuyên, Trần Quốc Trọng, Đình Chiến, Lê Mạnh, Xuân Huy, Đức Lợi, Thùy Dung...		Historical, Biography, War, Drama	Adapted from Nguyễn Trường Thanh's novel of the same name. Celebrating the August Revolution.
3 Sep	Huyền thoại vườn vải (Legend of Lychee Garden)	1	VTV Audio Visual Center	Nguyễn Khải Hưng (director); Lê Phương (writer); Đức Trung, Thu Quế, Việt Thắng, Ngọc Quốc, Trọng Trinh, Lệ Dung, Phú Đôn, Hồng Kiên, Trung Cường, Anh Phương, Minh Phương...		Drama, Historical	Celebrating the National Day
10 Sep	Ảo ảnh giữa đời thường (Illusion in Normal Life)	1	VTV's Literature & Art Committee	Trần Lực (director); Đỗ Trí Hùng (writer); Công Lý, Ngọc Dung...		Comedy, Slice-of-Life	
17-24 Sep	Tham vọng (Ambition)	2	VTV's Literature & Art Committee	Trần Quốc Trọng (director); Bành Mai Phương (writer); Bùi Bài Bình, Quế Hằng, Quốc Trọng, Vân Hà, Mạnh Cường, Xuân Thức, Ngô Cừ, Bá Cường, Hoàng Sơn, Thái An, Hoàng Duy...		Drama	
1 Oct	Một chuyện đã qua (It's Over)	1	VTV's Literature & Art Committee			Drama	
8-29 Oct	12A và 4H (12A and 4H)	4 (72′)	VTV Audio Visual Center	Bùi Thạc Chuyên, Trần Quốc Trọng (directors); Nguyễn Mỹ Linh, Nguyễn Thu Dung, Bùi Thạc Chuyên (writers); Thu Hương, Huệ Anh, An Quý, Thu Hiền, Quốc Bảo, Xuân Bắc, Anh Tuấn, Quốc Khánh, Thanh Bình, Thùy Linh, Quang Thanh, Quốc Tuấn, Tú Oanh, Phát Triệu, Thanh Chi, Tuyết Mai, Trọng Khôi, Như Quỳnh, Trọng Trinh, Đức Trung, Ngọc Thu, Quốc Trị, Văn Toản, Hương Dung, Trần Quốc Trọng, Trọng Phan...	Mùa hè đã qua (The Summer is Over) by Minh Thu	Scholastic, Coming-of-Age, Drama, Romance	Remake of 1992 feature film Vĩnh biệt mùa hè (Farewell Summer), adapted from Nguyễn Đông Thức's novel of the same name.
5 Nov	Chiếc xe để sát chân tường (The Bike Placed Close to the Wall)	1	VTV Audio Visual Center	Mạc Văn Chung (director); Cao Tiến Lê (writer); Trung Hiếu, Kim Thúy, Hương Dung, Phát Triệu...		Drama	
12 Nov	Khúc nhạc tuổi thơ (The Melody For Childhood)	1 (68′)	VTV Audio Visual Center	Nguyễn Thế Hồng (director); Đỗ Quảng (writer); Trần Đức, Thanh Hà, Thanh Thủy, Đỗ Kỷ, Vũ Kiểm, Kim Thúy, Lê Quỳnh Trang, Nguyễn Ngọc Toàn, Đoàn Thế Sơn...	Khúc nhạc tuổi thơ (The Melody For Childhood) by Thúy Thúy	Children, Slice-of-Life, Drama	
19 Nov	Chú bé mất tích (The Missing Boy)	1	VTV Audio Visual Center	Trần Quốc Trọng (director); Anh Tuấn...		Drama	
26 Nov-17 Dec	Tu hú gọi bầy (Koel Calling Flock)	4	VTV Audio Visual Center	Bùi Cường (director); Nguyễn Khải Hưng (writer); Trần Hạnh, Thanh Nga, Tiểu Lưu, Bích Thủy, Lương Hữu Đại, Ngọc Hoa, Tuyết Liên, Anh Huy, Đức Mẫn, Huỳnh Phương, Thu An...		Drama	Adapted from Nguyễn Đình Lượng's novel of the same name
24 Dec	Tứ tấu mùa thu (Autumn Quartet)	1	VTV Audio Visual Center	Thanh Nga, Kim Lân, Tiến Đạt, Minh Hằng, Đức Trung, Xuân Lộc, An Ngọc, Anh Tú, Đức Phương...		Drama, Musical	
31 Dec	Followed by the playback of Những mảnh vỡ hoàn hảo (Perfect Fragments). The single-episode drama was first released on VTV in 1995 Tet holiday.						

== See also ==
- List of dramas broadcast by Vietnam Television (VTV)
- List of dramas broadcast by Hanoi Radio Television (HanoiTV)
- List of dramas broadcast by Vietnam Digital Television (VTC)
