= List of VTV films broadcast in 1982–1993 =

This is a list of VTV dramas released in the period of 1982–1993.

1982–1993 – 1994→

== Films ==
During the period from 1982 to 1993, new Vietnamese television films were released sporadically on VTV1. Besides, there were still several certain time slots to playback Vietnamese feature films.

- Note: Since 1985, Vietnam Audio Visual Company (Vietnamese: Công ty nghe nhìn Việt Nam), which was established in 1980, had been converted to Vietnam Television Audio Visual Center (Vietnamese: Trung tâm nghe nhìn - Đài truyền hình Việt Nam).

Broadcast	Title	Eps.	Prod.	Cast and crew	Theme song(s)	Genre	Notes
1982	Người thành phố (Urban People)	1	Vietnam Audio Visual Co.	Nguyễn Khải Hưng (director & writer); Quốc Trị, Quế Hằng...		Drama, Slice-of-Life	Airs as a Tet drama
1983	Đứa con tôi (My Child)	1	Vietnam Audio Visual Co.	Nguyễn Khải Hưng (director); Sĩ Hanh (writers); Minh Hằng...		Drama, Slice-of-Life, Children	Adapted from a theatrical script
1985	Cánh diều nhỏ (Little Kite)	1	VTV Audio Visual Center	Nguyễn Khải Hưng (director); Tuệ Minh...		Drama	
1986	Bản anh hùng ca số 5 (The Epic Song Number 5)	1	VTV Audio Visual Center	Nguyễn Khải Hưng (director); Hoàng Dũng...		Drama, War, Historical	
1987	Đứa con lưu lạc (The Lost Child)	1	VTV's Literature & Art Committee	Tô Thi, Chu Thơm (writer)		Drama	
1988	Bến đợi (Awaiting Wharf)	1	VTV Audio Visual Center	Nguyễn Khải Hưng (director); Trần Hạnh...		Drama, Rural	
1989	Mặt trời bé con (My Teeny Tiny Sun)	1	VTV Audio Visual Center	Nguyễn Khải Hưng (director)		Drama, Slice-of-Life	Adapted from Thùy Linh's short story 'Mặt trời bé con của tôi'
	Vụ án không khởi tố (Unprosecuted Case)	1	VTV Audio Visual Center	Nguyễn Khải Hưng (director)		Drama, Crime	
1991	Niềm tin của mẹ (Mother's Faith)	1	VTV's Literature & Art Committee	Chu Thơm (writer)		Drama, Family, Rural	
1992	Lời nguyền của dòng sông (Curse of the River)	1 (68′)	VTV Audio Visual Center	Nguyễn Khải Hưng (director & writer); Trịnh Thịnh, Thanh Nga, Trần Quốc Trọng, Minh Quốc, Kim Thoa, Minh Thu, Trần Bích, Vân Anh, Bích Thủy, Mai Liên, Lê Phệ, Lê Liên...	Lời nguyền (The Curse); Composed by Vũ Thảo; Performed by Trọng Thủy	Drama, Romance, Family, Rural	Adapted from short story of 'Mùa hoa cải bên sông' by Nguyễn Quang Thiều
1992	Trăng muộn (Late Moon)	1	VTV Audio Visual Center	Khải Hưng (director); Mạc Văn Chung (writer); Trần Lực, Phương Thanh, Nhật Đức, Đình Chiến, Trần Sơn, Hoàng Yến, Thanh Bình, Minh Nguyệt...	Trăng muộn (Late Moon) by Lê Dung	Drama	
1993	Tiếng gọi bên sông (The Call By the Side of River)	1	VTV Audio Visual Center	Lê Cường Việt (director); Nguyễn Hữu Phần (writer); Lê Khanh...		Drama, Rural, Romance	Airs as a Tet drama. Adapted from Nguyễn Quang Thiều's short story 'Tiếng gọi cuối mùa đông'.

== See also ==
- List of dramas broadcast by Vietnam Television (VTV)
- List of dramas broadcast by Hanoi Radio Television (HanoiTV)
- List of dramas broadcast by Vietnam Digital Television (VTC)
