= My Mother-in-Law =

My Mother-in-Law Mẹ chồng tôi
- Directed by: Nguyễn Khải Hưng; Lan Hương
- Screenplay by: Quang Huy; Nguyễn Minh Chính (short story)
- Produced by: Nguyễn Khải Hưng
- Starring: Thu An; Chiều Xuân; Trần Lực
- Edited by: Vũ Xuân Thu
- Music by: Vũ Thảo
- Production company: Vietnam Television Film Center
- Distributed by: VTV; Khai Hung Film
- Release date: 1994
- Running time: 80 minutes x 2 chaps
- Country: Vietnam
- Language: Vietnamese

My Mother-in-Law (Vietnamese: Mẹ chồng tôi) is a 1993 Vietnamese telefilm adapted from Nguyễn Minh Chính's October 1993 short story of the same name.

== Plot ==
Right after the wedding, Thuận's husband goes to the front line leaving no time for them to have a baby. Then, Thuận (Chiều Xuân) meets commune officer Lực (Trần Lực) and they fall in love. Thuận ends up having Lực's daughter. Thuận's mother-in-law (Thu An) finds out and advises her to break up with Lực, while keeping the child a secret. Lực volunteers to join the army and dies in battle. Thuận is reported to be well and her mother-in-law guides the niece-granddaughter to visit her own father's grave.

Nước đã đánh phèn đừng cho bùn vẩn lên. Không ai thành thánh ngay được.
Lẽ tạo hóa không khác được, làm người đàn bà cực nhọc lắm mà cũng hạnh phúc lắm, rồi con sẽ thay mẹ, cháu sẽ thay con, nối nhau, bồi đắp mãi cho mảnh đất này. Muốn thế phải giữ tình người cho đẹp.

— Said "my mother-in-law"

== Production ==
Production was executed in the Đông Anh District, lasting about 1 month in 1993. The film was produced by Vietnam Television Film Center and directed by Nguyễn Khải Hưng.

=== Art ===
- Camera: Huy Thuần
- Design: Lê Liên, Hồ Đồng
- Sound: Hồng Sơn, Mạnh Kiên
- Make-up: Minh Thu
- Costume: Trần Văn
- Light: Minh Hoàng, Minh Châu
- Video technology: Xuân Vũ, Hoàng Sơn

=== Music ===
- Theme song My mother by Vũ Thảo

=== Cast ===
- Thu An ... Mrs Hòa – Thuận's mother-in-law
- Chiều Xuân ... Thuận
- Trần Lực ... Lực
- Thanh Thúy
- Văn Hiệp
- Tuyết Liên
- Phạm Đôn
- Phát Triệu
- Thanh Bình

== Broadcast ==
My Mother-in-Law released during the Sunday Show (Văn nghệ chủ nhật) of VFC+VTV in summer 1994 and quickly became the "phenomenon" of 90's Vietnamese television. Lead actress Thu An was named as My mother-in-law or The best mother-in-law of the Gulf of Tonkin (Bà mẹ chồng tốt nhất vịnh Bắc Bộ) by fans.
