= List of dramas broadcast by Hanoi Radio Television (HanoiTV) =

This is a list of dramas released by the Hanoi Radio Television network.

== #B ==
Broadcast	Title	Eps.	Prod.	Cast and crew	Theme song(s)	Genre	Notes
1996	Bà và cháu (Grandma and Grandson)	2	HanoiTV's Literature & Art Committee	Cao Mạnh, Trần Lực (directors); Nguyễn Thị Hồng Ngát (writer); Hoàng Yến, Hoàng Duy, Trần Lực, Mai Phương, Minh Vượng, Đình Chiến, Thành An, Trần Tiệp, Ngọc Quốc, Quốc Dũng, Hoa Thúy, Vân Anh, Việt Hiếu...		Drama, Rural, Family, Political	Adapted from Ma Văn Kháng's novel 'Côi cút giữa cảnh đời'
2003	Bạn cùng lứa (The Peers)	1 (75′)	HanoiTV's Literature & Art Committee	Lê Lực (director & writer); Lâm Tùng, Trịnh Mai Nguyên, Thu Hà, Phát Triệu, Hữu Độ, Tuyết Mai, Vĩnh Xương, Thanh Hải, Phạm Thanh Hòa, Kiều Đức, Vân Ngọc, Kiều Trang, Tuyết Nhung, Nam Cường, Văn Tân, Như Thành, Thùy Minh, Ngọc Huyền, Tấn Minh...		Drama, Slice-of-Life, Romance	Airs as a Tết drama
	Bên kia sông (Across the River)	1 (87′)	HanoiTV's Literature & Art Committee	Cao Mạnh (director); Hương Trà (writer); Vũ Đình Thân, Minh Hòa, Trần Thạch, Thúy Hà, Tuyết Mai, Thùy Hương, Phát Triệu, Ngọc Thoa, Lê Mai, Ngọc Tản, Phú Đôn, Văn Hiệp, Kim Xuyến, Thế Bình, Quốc Khánh, Vĩnh Xương, Ngọc Vân, Thanh Bình, Trần Đức...		Drama, Romance, Slice-of-Life	
	Bến bờ (Dock)	2	HanoiTV's Literature & Art Committee	Lan Hương, Phương Phương, Anh Tú, Mạnh Cường, Phạm Bằng, Đặng Trần Quỳnh, Kim Xuyến, Thanh Dương, Trần Hạnh, Ngọc Huyền, Đặng Tân, Thúy Bình, Xuân Đồng, Thanh Duyên, Văn Khải, Minh Tân, Ngọc Tranh...	'Bến bờ' theme song by Hương Giang	Drama	
2002	Bến cuộc đời (Dock of Life)	1	HanoiTV's Literature & Art Committee	Cao Khương (director); Lương Hùng, Cao Khương (writers); Hải Hà, Hồng Đức, Ánh Tuyết, Diệp Bích, Thế Hiển, Thu Phương, Trần Nhượng...		Drama	
2001	Bến quê (Home Wharf)	1 (82′)	HAVISCO	Phương Dung (director); Phạm Thanh Phong (writer); Phú Thăng, Minh Hằng, Minh Phương, Thu Huyền, Minh Tuấn, Hữu Nông, Hồng Minh, Lý Bá Vũ, Kim Thoa, Hữu Phương, Văn Nam, Trần Chiến...		Drama, Slice-of-Life, Family	Adapted from Tấn Hào's short story of the same name
1999	Bi kịch màu trắng (White Tragedy)	2 (80′)	HanoiTV's Literature & Art Committee	Cao Mạnh (director); Bùi Thu Hồng (writer); Công Dũng, Lâm Thanh, Trần Đức, Hương Dung, Dương Mạc An Tôn, Việt Thắng, Xuân Tùng, Ngọc Thủy, Phát Triệu, Lê Tản, Trung Nghĩa, Thanh Phượng, Phương Thanh, Thanh Huyền...		Drama, Slice-of-Life, Family, Crime	
	Biển khát (Desire of the Sea)	1 (76′)	HanoiTV's Literature & Art Committee	Hoàng Thanh Du (director & writer); Tuấn Quang, Ngọc Dung, Lê Tuấn, Tiến Đạt, Quốc Dũng, Ngọc Tản, Thanh Nga, Văn Chung, Thúy Hà, Văn Cường, Xuân Bách, Xuân Tốt, Kỳ Hoa, Thu Hạ, Kim Thắng, Đan Long, Đặng Quỳnh, Hoàng Du Ka, Văn Hà...	Biển khát (Desire of the Ocean) by Mỹ Linh	Drama, Romance	Based on theatrical script by Nguyễn Anh Biên
2003	Bình minh đỏ (Red Dawn)	10 (50′)	HAVISCO	Trần Phương (director); Trần Phương Thủy (writer); Trịnh Đình Lương, Phạm Cường, Đặng Ngọc Tuấn, Nguyễn Chung, Minh Đức, Vũ Hạnh, Đặng Ngọc Lâm, Đình Hùng, Sasa, Vadim, Minh Tuấn, Ngọc Thư, Lương Hữu Đại, Cao Nga, Anh Huy, Mạnh Kiểm, Mai Ngọc Căn, Xuân Thức, Hồ Trung, Thu Phương, Văn Toàn, Bích Thủy, Xuân Tình, Minh Lượng...		Biography, Drama, Historical, War	Based on Nguyễn Lương Bằng and Trường Chinh's life. Filmed in Vietnam and China.
2000	Bụi hồ (Dust)	2 (85′)	HanoiTV's Literature & Art Committee	Quý Dũng (director); Nguyễn Anh Tuấn, Trần Tùng Linh (writers); Trần Gia Minh, Thu Hải, Đường Minh Giang, Địch Ngọc Đạo, Ngọc Toàn, Hoàng Thắng, Trần Thanh, Lê Hưng, Ngọc Huy, Trần Trung, Quốc Thảo, Nguyễn Tuấn, Cường Liều, Minh Phương, Minh Trang...		Drama, Crime, Romance	Adapted from Hoàng Thế Sinh's novel of the same name
1998; Jan	Búp bê cho người lớn (Doll For Adults)	1	HanoiTV			Drama	
1999	Búp bê mùa hạ (Summer Doll)	1 (75′)	HanoiTV	Phan Thiết Sơn (director); Nguyễn Thu Dung (writer); Nông Thu Trang, Hồng Quang, Minh Hằng, Hoàng Mai, Tiến Mộc, Nam Cường, Quang Tú, Tùng Lâm, Ngọc Bích, Hồng Gấm, Thu Hà, Văn Quang, Lê Na, Bích Ngọc, Lê Lan, Đào Thị Loan...		Children, Family, Drama	Adapted from Trần Đức Tiến's short story 'Những con búp bê'

== #C ==
Broadcast	Title	Eps.	Prod.	Cast and crew	Theme song(s)	Genre	Notes
1999	Câu hát tìm nhau (Singing Finding Each Other)	1	HanoiTV's Literature & Art Committee	Phạm Đông (director); Quế Hương (writer); Trần Hạnh, Thu An, Thùy Ngân, Hoàng Thanh Giang, Thanh Chi, Ngọc Tân, Tuấn Quang, Ngọc Trung, Hoàng Thanh Du, Minh Thúy...		Drama, Romance	
1996	Cha tôi và hai người đàn bà (My Father and His Two Women)	1 (102′)	VFS	Vũ Châu (director); Nguyễn Thị Hồng Ngát (writer); Lê Công Tuấn Anh, Minh Hòa, Quách Thu Phương, Thu Hương, Hồng Hạnh, Ngọc Quân, Huyền Trang, Ngọc Thư, Linh Chi, Minh Tuấn, Hoàng Thanh Tuấn, Hồng Quang, Mạnh Tuấn, Hương Dung, Mỹ Lan, Ngọc Ánh, Trần Cường...		Drama, Marriage, Family, Romance	
2001	Cha con ông giám đốc (The Director and His Son)	1 (83′)	HAVISCO	Nguyễn Quang (director); Trịnh Thanh Nhã (writer); Hữu Độ, Ngọc Thoa, Lê Tuấn, Thu Hương, Duy Hậu, Thanh Chi, Thu Thủy, Việt Hà, Ngọc Thư, Hoàng Công, Văn Trung...	Tự cảm (Self-Feeling) by Mai Hoa	Drama, Office, Family	Based on Nguyễn Xuân Hưng's short story 'Cuộc phỏng vấn'
1998	Chân dung tình yêu (Portrait of Love)	2 (90′)	HAVISCO	Trần Trung Nhàn (director); Võ Khắc Nghiêm (writer); Thanh Bình, Xuân Nam, Thu Hương, Phạm Học Hải, Thu An, Anh Dũng, Minh Hằng, Trần Hợp, Chu Xuân Hoan, Thanh Hiền, Ngọc Côn...	Chân dung tình yêu (Portrait of Love) by Lê Dung	Drama, Romance	
1997	Chiều không nhạt nắng (Afternoon Where Sunny Won't Fade)	1 (76′)	HAVISCO	Trần Lực (director); Lê Phương (writer); Phương Nhi, Trần Tiệp, Dương Viết Bát, Nhật Đức, Duy Hậu, Ngọc Thoa, Tuyết Liên, Lan Hương, Lan, Mạnh Kiên, Trang Phượng...		Drama, Family, Slice-of-Life, Romance	
1999	Chìm nổi bên sông (Sinking Floating by the River)	1	HAVISCO	Trần Trung Nhàn (director)		Drama, Slice-of-Life	
2008; 3-16 Feb; 21:00 Daily	Con đường sáng (The Bright Way)	15 (50′)	HAVISCO & QTV	Phạm Việt Thanh, Nguyễn Đức Việt (directors); Bùi Duy Khánh (writer); Xuân Bắc, Đan Lê, Hoa Thúy, Lê Khanh, Trần Lực, Trọng Trinh, Hồng Đăng, Minh Phương, An Chinh, Thu Hằng, Dương Đức Quang, Đức Mạnh, Huỳnh Phương, Đình Viện, Đào Duy Tuấn, Bùi Chương, Tuấn Tài, Hoàng Doãn Phan, Chí Công, Thanh Lợi, Mạnh Hùng, Hoàng Thục, Thanh Hiền, Trần Nhân Hậu, Thanh Nhàn, Đặng Thị Hà, Mạnh Hà, Lê Quốc Thắng, Phạm Minh Nguyệt, Thanh Hương, Ngọc Bích, Ngô Thanh Hà, Bá Tâm, Ngọc Thảo, Cao Văn Hòa, Quang Định, Lê Chẩn, Vũ Linh, Võ Thành Tâm, Tấn Hưng, Quý Bình, Đức Hải...		Biography, Drama, War, Historical, Intelligence	Airs as a Tet drama (26 Dec to 10 Jan Lunar New Year). Celebrating 78 Years of Vietnam Communist Party. Based on Hoàng Minh Đạo's life. Produced in 2006–2007. The cast changes with each stages of the plot.
1996; 20 Nov-6 Dec; 21:00 Wed-Fri	Con sẽ là cô chủ (I Will Be Wealthy)	6 (90′)	HAVISCO	Hà Lê Sơn (director & writer); Mai Phương, Bích Ngọc, Thúy Hiền, Anh Huy, Kim Xuyến, Tiến Đạt, Phát Triệu, Diệu Thuần, Tố Uyên, Vũ Phạm Từ, Minh Vương, Tấn Dương, Kim Chi, Bích Thủy, Thái An, Lê Thị Thư, Trần Hạnh, Thu Thủy, Kim Tuyến, Kim Liên, Hoàng Tuấn, Kim Thoa, Hoàng An, Lê Thu, Thái Sơn, Quốc Tuấn, Kim Chi, Đỗ Kỷ...	Trở về Hà Nội (Return to Hanoi) by Mỹ Linh	Drama	
1994	Cỏ ngọt (Sweet Grass)	1	HanoiTV's Literature & Art Committee	Phạm Thanh Phong (writer)		Drama	Adapted from Phạm Thanh Phong's short story 'Quà cưới'
2006	Cổ tích của ngày mưa (Rainy Day's Fairy Tale)	1 (75′)	HanoiTV's Literature & Art Committee	Cao Mạnh (director); Nguyễn Việt Hà (writer); Dũng Nhi, Hải Yến, Thùy Dương, Tiến Lộc, Anh Vũ, Đào Hùng, Phương Khanh, Bích Ngọc, Khôi Nguyên, Thanh Vân, Minh Hoàng, Trọng Hoàn...		Drama, Slice-of-Life, Fantasy	

== #Đ ==
Broadcast	Title	Eps.	Prod.	Cast and crew	Theme song(s)	Genre	Notes
1998; Nov	Đám cưới đêm mưa (Rainy Night Wedding)	1	HanoiTV's Literature & Art Committee	Hoàng Thanh Du (director & writer); Trần Hạnh, Hoàng Cúc, Trịnh Mai, Việt Thắng, Hoàng Mai, Bình Hải, Vân Anh, Hoàng Giang, Chu Sương, Minh Thúy, Xuân Quyến, Xuân Khu, Khánh Toàn, Hữu Thắng, Đinh Qúy...		Drama, Crime, Slice-of-Life	
2004	Đảo khát (Thirsty Island)	1 (80′)	QTV & HAVISCO	Vương Đức, Khuất Thị Vân Huyền (directors); Sơn Trang, Phạm Thành (writers); Hoàng Thông, Quỳnh Trang, Hữu Mười, Quốc Trị, Phạm Hoàng Hà, Phạm Quang Xuân, Đức Long, Anh Tuấn, Bùi Thị Quyết, Nguyễn Văn Sơn, Nguyễn Văn Chất...		Drama, Slice-of-Life, Rural	
1998	Đường ra thành phố (Road to the city)	2 (60′)	HanoiTV's Literature & Art Committee	Trần Mạnh Cường (director); Quý Hải (writer); Hoàng Lan, Xuân Tùng, Anh Quân, Thu Ngân, Thu Hương, Bá Cường, Mỹ Duyên, Tuyết Mai, Phát Triệu, Điền Viên, Đình Chiến, Đức Khuê, Thế Bình, Kim Thoa, Thành An, Ngọc Bích, Tuệ Minh, Hoàng Dũng, Lê Tuấn, Thu Thủy, Hồ Phong, Vũ Tăng, Ngọc Tản, Văn Bình, Công Hiệp, Hoàng Tùng, Ngọc Tuấn, Hồng Điệp...		Drama, Business	

== #G ==
Broadcast	Title	Eps.	Prod.	Cast and crew	Theme song(s)	Genre	Notes
	Giành giật (Dispute)	1 (75′)	HanoiTV's Literature & Art Committee	Lê Lực (director); Hoàng Nhung (writer); Thành Long, Ngọc Lan, Quỳnh Hoa, Khôi Nguyên, Phương Khanh, Quốc Đoàn, Huyền Thanh, Đinh Sản, Mạnh Cường, Kim Thoa...		Drama, Family, Coming-of-Age	
1996	Giấc mơ hoa (Bloom Dream)	1 (90′)	HanoiTV's Literature & Art Committee	Nguyễn Anh Thái (director); Mỹ Hạnh, Thanh Quý, Trần Đức, Thu Phòng, Duy Thanh, Trần Quang, Tiến Mộc, Huyền Trang, Phú Thăng, Thu An, Anh Thái, Vân Dung, Hồng Hạnh, Thùy Dương, Thanh Lâm, Thanh Tùng, Anh Minh, Tiến Mạnh, Bá Anh, Phú Đôn, Công Tuấn, Hương Dung...		Drama, Slice-of-Life, Business	
	Gió chuyển mùa (The Wind That Turning Season)	1 (60′)	HanoiTV's Literature & Art Committee	Quý Dũng (director); Phạm Thanh Phong (writer); Phát Triệu, Thúy Phương, Phạm Bằng, Diệu Thuần, Văn Toản, Diệu Thùy, Thành An, Việt Thắng...	'Gió chuyển mùa' theme song by Đức Long	Drama, Family, Coming-of-Age	
1997	Giọt nước mắt giữa hai thế kỷ (The Teardrop Between Two Centuries)	10 (80′)	HAVISCO	Trần Phương, Nguyễn Thế Vĩnh (directors); Lê Phương, Đỗ Quảng, Trịnh Thanh Nhã (writers); Phạm Cường, Quyền Linh, Thu Hải, Hoàng Lan, Trần Hạnh, Ngọc Thoa, Thu Hạnh, Hữu Độ, Khôi Nguyên, Xuân Tùng, Kim Thoa, Minh Hòa, Trần Nhượng, Hoàng Yến, Lan Minh, Hoàng Sơn, Thanh Thủy, Hữu Thái, Hồng Giang, Tuấn Quang, Bích Phượng, Bích Thủy, Tuấn Dương, Công Bảy, Nguyên Mẫn, Trần Chung, Đại Dương, Huỳnh Phương, Ngân Hoa...	Lời ru ngàn xưa (Thousands Years Lullaby); Opening version by Đức Bình; Ending version by Trần Thu Hà	Drama, Slice-of-Life, Business, Romance	

== #H ==
Broadcast	Title	Eps.	Prod.	Cast and crew	Theme song(s)	Genre	Notes
	Hà Nội trong mắt em (Ha Noi in my Eyes)	40	HanoiTV	Đào Thanh Hưng (director); Trần Hoàng Thái Ly, Nguyễn Ngọc Quỳnh Chi, Trần Hải Anh, Nguyễn Ngân Hà, Trần Ngọc Mai, Nguyễn Minh Khoa (writers); Minh Hằng, Trọng Trinh, Đỗ Kỷ, Chiều Xuân, Minh Trang, Minh Phương, Quỳnh Kool, Huỳnh Anh, Quốc Anh, Khánh Linh, Thu Hòa, Hà My, Ngọc Diệp, Trung Anh, Thanh Dương, Thanh Tú, Hoàng Sơn, Việt Bắc, Hồng Liên, Thục Anh, Đức Châu, Đức Hiếu, Nguyễn Hùng, Vũ Phương...	Hà Nội trong mắt em (Ha Noi in my Eyes) by Bùi Hà My	Drama, Romance	Celebrating the 70th anniversary of the Capital Liberation Day. Made for film project For the Love of Ha Noi.
2003	Hạnh phúc đợi chờ (Awaiting Happiness)	1 (70′)	HanoiTV's Leterature & Art Committee	Nguyễn Anh Dũng (director & writer); Phương Thanh, Trần Nhượng, Diệu Thuần, Trung Anh, Thu Thủy, Thanh Tùng, Phát Triệu, Thúy Ngần, Quang Anh, Ngân Hoa, Đình Chiến, Việt Thắng, Kim Yến, Trần Mạnh, Hữu Lý...		Drama, Marriage	
2007	Hắn là tôi (It's Me Who Did It)	13 (50′)	HAVISCO	Nguyễn Quang (director); Lâm Quang Ngọc, Nguyễn Quang (writer); Quang Ánh, Kiều Đức Anh, Thùy Dung, Vi Cầm, Thanh Hà, Kiều Thị Thúy, Thanh Chi, Dạ Lê, Khôi Nguyên, Huyền Thanh, Văn Hiêp, Thanh Giang, Nam Cường, Tạ Thu, Thúy Hằng, Hoàng Hiệp, Hà Vinh...	Lối xưa (The Old Way) by Mai Hoa	Drama, Marriage, Romance	Adapted from Trần Gia Thái's long story of the same name
2003	Hẹn gặp lại (See You Again)	1 (75′)	HanoiTV's Literature & Art Committee	Lê Lực (director); Đoàn Minh Tuấn (writer); Elena, Thanh Tùng, Lan Minh, Thùy Dương, Minh Phương, Tania, Sasa, Minh Hiếu, Ngọc Vân, Diệu Linh, Quang Thiện, Nguyễn Triều...		Drama, Slice-of-Life	Airs as Tết drama
2001	Họ mãi là đồng đội (Forever Comrades)	2 (82′)	HAVISCO	Hữu Thanh (director); Bùi Duy Khánh (writer); Văn Báu, Phương Lâm, Đức Sơn, Bích Huyền, Minh Phương, Quang Trung, Cao Nga, Anh Tuấn, Hồng Điệp, Danh Phương, Huy Hoàng, Trần Thụ, Phan Hải, Duy Thuyên, Hữu Phương...		Drama, Post-war	
2000	Hoa cúc trắng (White Chrysanthemum)	1 (70′)	HanoiTV's Literature & Art Committee	Lê Lực (director); Nguyễn Thị Ngọc Trâm (writer); Thu Hà, Bá Anh, Sasa, Tiến Minh, Tuyết Liên, Mai Châu, Phương Lâm, Hữu Độ, Huyền Thanh, Bích Diệp, Ngọc Diệp, Thành Long, Hải Yến...		Drama, Slice-of-Life, Post-war, Romance	
1998; 19 & 22 Feb; 21:00 Thu-Sun	Họa mi về tổ (Nightingale Returns to Its Nest)	2 (90′)	HAVISCO	Hữu Thanh (director); Hoàng Nhung (writer); Quỳnh Hoa, Hà Văn Trọng, Phương Thanh, Vĩnh Xương, Thành Long, Trần Trung Nhàn, Nguyệt Nga, Anh Dũng, Phạm Tự, Trần Sơn, Lưu Tuấn, Ánh Ngọc, Thùy Trang, Văn Thiệu, Tuyết Mai, Thu An, Phát Triệu, Trần Đường, Nguyễn Thị Phương, Lan Hương 'Bông', Hoàng Lân, Hồng Hải, Minh Khuê, Đạt Khôi...		Drama, Slice-of-Life, Romance	
2001	Hồi ức tình yêu (Memories of Love)	6 (50′)	HAVISCO	Trần Trung Nhàn, Trần Bích Ngọc (directors); Nguyễn Khắc Phục (writer); Xuân Trường, Sĩ Tiến, Lê Khanh, Hương Thảo, Tuyết Liên, Thành An, Thanh Tú, Minh Đức, Phạm Hồng Minh, Hữu Độ, Hồng Giang, Văn Toản, Đức Dũng, Viết Minh, Thái An, Trương Thị Hải, Trịnh Lê Phong, Hạnh Lâm, Lê Thị Chung, Duy Phương, Lý Chừ, Phan Xuân Ích, Lê Đức Thiện, Quốc Tuấn, Andrew Hardy...	Tình yêu ở lại (Love Stays) by Hồng Nhung	Drama, Slice-of-Life, Romance	Planned with 2 parts but only part 1 was produced

== #K ==
Broadcast	Title	Eps.	Prod.	Cast and crew	Theme song(s)	Genre	Notes
2002	Khát vọng tới bình mình (Desire to Sunrise)	1	HAVISCO	Trần Phương (director); Trần Phương Thủy (writer)		Drama	
1998	Khi người cha lâm nạn (A Father In Distress)	2 (80′)	HAVISCO	Phạm Thanh Phong (director); Đào Phương Liên, Trịnh Thanh Nhã (writers); Mai Hòa, Lâm Tùng, Tuấn Hải, Phương Nhung, Đức Thuận, Cúc Phương, Hữu Độ, Ngọc Tuyết, Minh Quốc, Thu Hằng, Quỳnh Dương, Thanh Vân, Quốc Đoàn, Hồng Điệp, Phương Hạnh, Phạm Hồng Minh, Quang Thông, Thu Hà, Mỹ Linh, Mạnh Kiểm, Mai Hoa, Tố Lan, Vân Tình, Hồng Hạnh, Ngọc Long, Quang Hưng...		Drama, Family, Legal	
2001	Khi người lính trở về (When the Soldier Returns)	1	HanoiTV's Literature & Art Committee	Cao Mạnh (director); Cao Khương (writer); Công Lý, Thu Hà, Thu Hương, Ngọc Quang, Tuấn Minh, Ngọc Lan, Thu An, Minh Quốc, Nguyễn Tuấn...		Drama	
2003	Kiếp nghèo (Poor Life)	1 (77′)	HanoiTV's Literature & Art Committee	Phạm Việt Thanh, Nguyễn Thế Vĩnh (directors); Lý Đại Long, Thanh Quý, Mai Phượng, Đoàn Dũng...		Drama	

== #L ==
Broadcast	Title	Eps.	Prod.	Cast and crew	Theme song(s)	Genre	Notes
2001	Lời thề Hypocrat (The Hippocratic Oath)	10 (50′)	HAVISCO	Phạm Thanh Phong (director); Phan Cao Toại, Trần Phương Thủy (writers); Tuấn Quang, Quách Thu Phương, Hữu Độ, Tuyết Mai, Thùy Dương, Bá Anh, Kim Hoàn, Hương Dung, Đức Khuê, Mai Hương, Hương Trà, Khôi Nguyên, Chu Văn Thức, Thu Hương, Tuấn Minh, Hoàng Lan, Mỹ Linh, Nam Cường, Quang Thắng, Đức Thuận, Phương Lâm, Quốc Khánh, Hồng Điệp, Thu Hà, Tuấn Dương, Mai Hòa, Phát Triệu, Thanh Hưng, Như Trung, Thu Hương, Phương Khanh, Huyền Thanh, Thành An, Mậu Hòa, Thu Hương, Hồng Điệp, Hồng Vân, Hải Hà, Thùy Quỳnh, Anh Quân, Phương Loan, Việt Hà...	Nói với anh (Talk to You) by Mai Hoa	Medical, Drama, Romance	

== #M ==
Broadcast	Title	Eps.	Prod.	Cast and crew	Theme song(s)	Genre	Notes
1997	Màn kịch vụng về (Clumsy Drama Scene)	1 (80′)	HanoiTV's Literature & Art Committee	Quý Dũng (director); Đỗ Trí Hùng (writer); Tiến Đạt, Hoàng Dũng, Lê Tuấn, Văn Hiệp, Lê Mai, Ngọc Quốc, Hạc Đính, Minh Quốc, Thanh Lâm, Hải Yến, Ngọc Tản, Thiếu Ngân, Anh Tú, Xuân Tình, Ngọc Bích, Hồng Khiêm, Thu Hiền, Nguyễn Gấm, An Ninh, Tuấn Long...		Comedy, Office, Drama	
	Màu nắng của cha (Father's Sunshine)	1 (80′)	HanoiTV	Cao Mạnh (director); Thảo Nguyên (writer); Thành An, Mai Phương, Duy Hậu, Hoàng Cúc, Mỹ Linh, Ly Ly, Thu An, Hoàng Dũng, Quế Hằng, Văn Hiệp, Kim Xuyến, Khôi Nguyên...		Drama, Kids	
2005	Mạnh hơn công lý (Stronger Than Justice)	13 (50′)	HAVISCO	Nguyễn Quang (director); Khuất Thị Vân Huyền (writer); Quế Hằng, Minh Tiệp, Quang Ánh, Linh Nga, Trần Thạch, Đào Hùng, Quỳnh Tứ, Thanh Hiền, Diệu Thuần, Hoàng Mai, Thùy Dương, Văn Thái, Trần Thu, Minh Tuấn, Mạnh Hiệp, Thu Hiền, Ngọc Thoa, Bình Xuyên, Tuấn Quang, Thế Vinh, Duy Thanh, Ngọc Thụ, Minh Toàn, Thanh Minh, Nam Cường, Quốc Hải, Ngọc Dung, Thanh Tú...	Xin lỗi cuộc đời (Pardon Me, My Life) & Nụ cười rất lạ (A Smile Feels Strange) by Tinna	Drama, Crime, Legal	Adapted from the novel of the same name by Võ Khắc Nghiêm
	Mật lệnh hoa sữa (Milk Flower Secret Order)	40	HanoiTV	Nguyễn Tất Kiên (director); Vũ Phương Thảo, Phạm Đình Hải (writers); Vũ Tuấn Việt, Lan Hương "Bông", Việt Thắng, Đức Khuê, Nguyệt Hằng, Phùng Tiến Minh, Minh Thảo, Kiều Anh, Phạm Anh Tuấn, Minh Cúc, Huy Hoàng, Nguyễn Xuân Thắng, Hoàng Long, Hoàng Xuân, Trần Quang Lâm, Võ Hoài Vũ, Hà Thành, Thu Hằng, Thu Thuỷ...	Lặng lẽ (Quietly) by Phùng Tiến Minh	Crime, Historical, Romance	Celebrating the 70th anniversary of the Capital Liberation Day. Made for film project For the Love of Ha Noi.
2000	Mật mã 1798 (The Code 1798)	2	Vivafilm & HanoiTV	Thùy Linh and others (writers)...		Drama	
2010; 4 Jan-22 Feb; 19:45 Mon-Tue-Wed	Men say (Yeast of Passion)	22 (45′)	HAVISCO	Nguyễn Đức Việt (director); Trần Phương Thủy (writer); Lưu Đê Ly, Bảo Kỳ, Tăng Nhật Tuệ, Văn Bích, Ngọc Quỳnh, Nguyễn Anh Dũng, Dương Minh Đức, Văn Thành, Thùy Liên, An Ninh, Nguyễn Ngọc Duy, Quế Hằng, Phạm Anh Dũng, Lê Mai, Thu Huyền, Văn Anh, Tăng Ngân Hà...	Có nhau ngày mới New Day With You by Lưu Hương Giang & Văn Anh Ngày gần anh (Day I Close to You) by Maya	Drama, Romance, Musical, Coming-of-Age	Launched HanoiTV's prime time slot for Vietnamese dramas
2003	Miếu làng (Village Fane)	1 (90′)	HAVISCO	Nguyễn Anh Thái (director); Hoài Thu (writer); Duy Hậu, Thanh Hiền, Xuân Bắc, Thu Hằng, Kim Thúy, Văn Đại, Đức Mẫn, Văn Toàn, Bá Hồng, Bích Vân, Hà Trung, Hoàng Dương...		Rural, Drama, Romance, Slice-of-Life	Adapted from Đức Ban's short story of the same name
2004	Một cuộc phỏng vấn (An Interview)	1 (77′)	HAVISCO	Nguyễn Quang (director); Trịnh Thanh Nhã (writer); Sĩ Tiến, Mai Khanh, Bá Anh, Quế Hằng, Hà Văn Trọng, Nguyễn Quang, Tùng Dương, Thu Hà, Thanh Thúy, Nguyễn Nam, Lâm Tùng, Thu Huyền, Thanh Loan, Trà My, Ngọc Cường, Hải Việt, Thế Bình...		Office, Romance, Slice-of-Life, Drama	
	Một ngày không bình thường (An Unusual Day)	1 (65′)	HanoiTV's Literature & Art Committee	Cao Mạnh (director); Trần Gia Thái (writer); Minh Hằng, Quang Thiện, Minh Quốc, Vũ Tăng, Thanh Tùng, Ngọc Tản, Phát Triệu, Lê Tuấn, Thu Huyền...		Comedy	
1996	Mùa đông không lạnh giá (Unfrozen Winter)	1 (90′)	HAVISCO	Nguyễn Hữu Phần (director); Phạm Dương Hải, Nguyễn Anh Dũng (writers); Sĩ Tiến, Hồng Hạnh, Bá Cường, Hoàng Dũng, Tuyết Mai, Thu An, Natasha, Duy Thanh, Hương Dung, Tuấn Dương, Việt Thắng, Thùy Hương, Vân Dung, Bình Trọng, Thu Hà...	Mùa đông không lạnh giá (Unfrozen Winter); Composed by Tuấn Phương	Romance, Drama	

== #N ==
Broadcast	Title	Eps.	Prod.	Cast and crew	Theme song(s)	Genre	Notes
1996; 17 Feb	Nàng Kiều trúng số (Miss Kiều Hits the Jackpot)	1 (90′)	HAVISCO	Lê Đức Tiến (director); Đoàn Trúc Quỳnh (writer); Trịnh Thịnh, Ngọc Lan, Trần Hạnh, Phát Triệu, Thanh Thủy, Vũ Tăng, Hoàng Yến, Tuyết Liên, Ngọc Thư, Ngọc Bích, Thu Huyền, Vũ Anh, Trần Đức, Trần Nhượng, Đức Sơn, Minh Tuấn, Minh Thúy, Thùy Dương, Mạnh Cường...		Drama, Slice-of-Life	Airs on 29 Dec Lunar Year as a Tết drama
2005	Nắng trong mắt bão (Sunshine in the Eye of Storm)	15 (50′)	HAVISCO	Phạm Thanh Phong (director); Phan Cao Toại (writer); Cao Đức Hùng, Lệ Hằng, Trung Anh, Minh Phương, Ngọc Dung, Nguyệt Hằng, Quỳnh Tứ, Bích Ngọc, Trần Thụ, Tuyết Mai, Nam Cường, Thu Loan, Phát Triệu, Hoàng Long, Công Dũng, Công Lý, Kim Hoàn, Văn Hà, Đức Khuê, Sĩ Tiến, Đình Chiến, Hoàng Mai, Anh Dũng, Khôi Nguyên, Kim Yến, Hương Trà, Đại Mý, Vũ Thu, Thành An, Hán Văn Thân, Thu Trang, Bá Anh, Chu Quốc Tuấn, Lê Phước, Mai Hiền, Thế Tục, Thương An, Minh Hằng, Ngọc Tuấn, Minh Hiếu...	'Nắng trong mắt bão' theme song by Thùy Dung	Medical, Drama, Slice-of-Life, Romance	
1997	Ngày Tết nhiệm màu (Magical Tết Day)	1 (65′)	HanoiTV's Literature & Art Committee	Văn Bích Thủy (director); Nguyễn Thu Dung (writer); Minh Phương, Anh Quân, Trung Anh, Xuân Thức, Bá Anh, Diệp Bích, Hoàng Thu Hường, Quốc Khánh, Anh Quân, Vân Dung, Cao Nga, Thu Thủy, Đức Khuê, Hoàng Sơn, Đức Hiếu...		Family, Children, Drama	
1997	Ngã ba giao thừa (Eve Junction)	1 (75′)	HAVISCO	Trần Trung Nhàn (director); Võ Khắc Nghiêm (writer); Kim Chi, Đức Sơn, Hoàng Sơn, Vân Anh, An Nguyên, Trần Bẩy, Thu Hương, Hồng Gấm, Thu Hiền, Thanh Huyền, Thúy Hà, Kiều Huệ...	'Ngã ba giao thừa' theme song by Trần Thu Hà & Thanh Tâm	Drama, Slice-of-Life	Airs as a Tết drama
1999	Ngã ba thời gian (Time Junction)	12 (80′)	HAVISCO	Trần Phương (director); Lê Phương, Đỗ Quảng, Trịnh Thanh Nhã (writers); Thành An, Lê Quang Thanh Tâm, Quách Thu Phương, Thế Tục, Hoàng Cúc, Bá Anh, Linh Huệ, Chu Văn Thức, Chu Xuân Hoan, Tất Đạt, Mạc Ninh, Thanh Bình, Vân Anh, Phương Nga, Nam Cường, Nguyễn Hải, Trần Nhượng, Ngọc Bích, Huy Công, Văn Phức, Xuân Trường, Mỹ Hạnh, Hồng Giang, Thùy Liên, Phát Triệu, Tuyết Mai...	Non nước (Landscape) by Thanh Lam	Drama, Rural, Family, Political	
2003	Ngọt ngào trong cay đắng (Sweet Thing in Bitterness)	2 (65′)	HanoiTV	Nguyễn Đặng Chương (director & writer); Trần Phương, Ngọc Huyền, Kim Hống, Thanh Tùng, Thành Dương, Thu Hương, Mạnh Tường, Thanh Thủy, Tuấn Quang...		Drama, Slice-of-Life, Crime	
2001	Người dưng (Strangers)	1 (78′)	HanoiTV's Film Committee & Vivafilm	Lê Lực (director); Nguyễn Khắc Phục, Hà Phạm Phú (writer); Quang Thiện, Diễm Lộc, Thành An, Ngọc Tản, Mỹ Linh, Lâm Tùng, Trịnh Mai Nguyên, Quang Minh, Tiến Đức, Hồng Quân, Lâm Thanh, Hải Anh, Văn Hồng, Ngọc Lan, Đức Mẫn, Văn Toản, Mạnh Thu...	Người dưng (Strangers) by Đức Long & VOV's Choir	Drama, Post-war	
2003	Người làng (Villagers)	1 (82′)	HanoiTV's Literature & Art Committee	Hoàng Thanh Du (director & writer); Quốc Toàn, Trần Hạnh, Tuấn Quang, Thanh Tùng, Hồng Hạnh, Phú Thăng, Vân Anh, Hoàng Thanh Du, Hồng Gấm, Văn Chương, Hoàng Sơn, Quốc Trung, Kim Mai, Thu Huyền, Hoàng Du Ka, Lê Nam...		Drama, Slice-of-Life	Adapted from Vũ Đình Minh's short story 'Buổi sáng bạn về'
1998	Nhiệm vụ bất đắc dĩ (Unavoidable Mission)	1 (72′)	HanoiTV's Literature & Art Committee	Quý Dũng (director); Đỗ Trí Hùng (writer); Văn Hiệp, Vũ Đình Thân, Minh Hằng, Hữu Độ...		Slice-of-Life, Family, Comedy, Post-war	
2001	Nhớ quê (Homesick)	1 (82′)	HanoiTV's Literature & Art Committee	Cao Mạnh (director); Hà Lê Uyên (writer); Trần Hạnh, Hoàng Dũng, Minh Hằng, Minh Dũng, Vân Anh, Lưu Nga, Hải Điệp, Văn Toản, Phú Đôn, Xuân Tiên, Minh Thảo, Trần Trung, Tuấn Minh, Thành Tuấn...		Drama, Slice-of-Life, Rural	
1998-1999	Những mảnh đời ngang trái (Lives and Fights)	8 (85′)	VFS & HanoiTV	Vũ Châu (director); Hạnh Lê, Thiên Phúc, Bành Mai Phương, Trần Thế Thành, Lưu Nghiệp Quỳnh (writers); Hoàng Lan, Xuân Trường, Thanh Tùng, Ngọc Thúy, Việt Thắng, Thanh Tú, Trần Nhượng, Tiến Quang, Huỳnh Phương, Mai Hương, Minh Đức, Mạnh Sinh, Vũ Tăng, Trần Hùng, Cát Trần Tùng, Minh Thúy, Hoàng Yến, Minh Tuấn, Thúy Ngần, Tuấn Dương, Ngọc Thu, Bá Cường, Ngọc Tản, Ngọc Quốc, Kiều Loan, Hữu Độ, Trịnh Thịnh, Lan Minh, Kim Xuyến, Đức Mẫn, Minh Hòa, Lâm Tùng, Việt Tú, Kim Hoa...		Drama, Rural, Period, Slice-of-Life	Based on the story "Làng rừng" by Nguyễn Khám. Planned with 2 parts but only part 1 was produced.
2001	Nối lại một chân dung (Resume a Portrait)	2 (83′)	HAVISCO	Nguyễn Anh Dũng (director); Bùi Duy Khánh (writer); Xuân Bắc, Thùy Linh, Tuấn Anh, Ngọc Tản, Quang Ánh, Tự Long, Phương Thanh, Mậu Hòa, Mỹ Hằng, Đình Thắng, Hoàng Tuấn, Quốc Hòa, Hoàng Quân, Hoàng Thắng, Trần Mai, Đặng Quý, Hồng Nhung, Anh Tuấn, Quốc Toàn, Hương Thảo, Anh Tuấn, Văn Thức, Hữu Mẫn, Phạm Tùng, Hồng Mơ, Thanh Hoài, Nguyễn Văn Nhàn, Trọng Phan, Hoàng Ngân, Bùi Văn Tự, Đồng Mai...		Drama, War	
	Núi đôi (Double Mountain)	1 (85′)	Hanoi's Literature & Art Committee	Vũ Châu (director); Nguyễn Thạch (writer); Kim Thúy, Việt Thắng, Phát Triệu, Đức Long, Glen Duy, Anh Huy, Dương Quảng, Hương Dung, Đức Trung, Bá Cường, Mạnh Hùng, Minh Thủy, Tiến Quang, Lan Minh, Thành An, Vân Hà, Vân Dung, Phạm Đông, Phương Tâm, Mạnh Cường, Mạnh Tùng, Minh Hà, Hà Quân...		Drama, Romance, Post-war	
2001	Nước mắt chảy xuôi (Tears Flows Down)	1	Hanoi's Literature & Art Committee	Cao Mạnh (director); Nguyễn Anh (writer); Trần Hạnh, Tiến Đạt, Minh Hằng, Trung Anh, Ngọc Thoa, Văn Hiệp, Hồng Sương...		Drama, Family	

== #P ==
Broadcast	Title	Eps.	Prod.	Cast and crew	Theme song(s)	Genre	Notes
	Phù sa ngọt (Sweet Alluvial)	55	HaNoiTV	Nguyễn Mạnh Hà (director); Đào Thùy Trang, Nguyễn Xuân Hải, Thuận Vương Thùy Anh (writers); Linh Sơn, Hà Phương Anh, Tiến Đạt, Bùi Minh Phương, Anh Thơ, Minh Tuấn, Quách Thu Phương, Hoàng Phượng, Đàm Hằng, Hoàng Du Ka, Quốc Toàn, Hàn Trang, Việt Pháp, Trần Kiện, Phạm Kiều Ánh, Vũ Hoài Phương, Đan Phương, Khánh Huyền, Lê Như Nguyễn Thành, Nguyễn Thành Luân, Bùi Đức Việt...	Hà Nội ơi thương nhớ (Oh Dear Ha Noi) by Trần Vân Anh	Drama, Romance	

== #Q ==
Broadcast	Title	Eps.	Prod.	Cast and crew	Theme song(s)	Genre	Notes
2001	Quanh quẩn chuyện làng (Again Another Village Story)	2 (50′)	HanoiTV's Literature & Art Committee			Rural, Drama	

== #S ==
Broadcast	Title	Eps.	Prod.	Cast and crew	Theme song(s)	Genre	Notes
1996	Sáng mãi tên anh (His Name Will Shine)	1 (70′)	HAVISCO	Vũ Phạm Từ (director); Nguyệt Ánh (writer); Huệ Hát, Văn Thắng, Quốc Toàn, Thúy An, Hoàng Yến, Tư Huyền, Đoàn Ngọc, Ngọc Dung, Quốc Huy, Ngọc Văn, Trường Khoa, Trần Vinh, Đức Mẫn, Quốc Tuấn, Tiến Quang, Hữu Liêm, Việt Cường, Quốc Dũng, Quang Ty, Đăng Khoa...		Biography, Drama, Historical	Based on Nguyễn Phong Sắc's life
1998	Sau những lỗi lầm (After All the Mistakes)	1 (97′)	HanoiTV's Literature & Art Committee	Trần Nhượng (director); Hồ Bá Thuần (writer); Tuấn Quang, Hoàng Lan, Thanh Quý, Hữu Độ, Thanh Bình, Ngọc Huyền, Huyền Thanh, Đăng Quỳnh, Thu Hương, Quốc Hùng, Ngọc Bích, Tiến Quang, Hồng Tuấn, Phương Hoa...	'Sau những lỗi lầm' theme song by Ngọc Anh 3A	Drama, Romance	
2000	Sóng ở đáy sông (Waves in the Riverbed)	10 (85′)	VFS & HanoiTV	Lê Đức Tiến (director); Lê Lựu, Lê Ngọc Minh (writers); Xuân Bắc, Thu Hường, Kim Oanh, Duy Hậu, Mai Hòa, Phùng Việt Quân, Phạm Minh Nguyệt, Bá Anh, Nguyễn Đăng Khoa, Nguyễn Như Hiền, Lê Quang Thiện, Đức Thịnh, Thu Hà, Phương Thanh, Anh Huy, Phạm Hồng Minh, Thanh Chi, Tố Hoàn, Ngọc Tản, Lệ Thu, Nguyễn Minh Phong, Quốc Khánh, Minh Ngọc, Ngọc Thủy, Diệu Thuần, Quốc Trị, Thanh Bình, Thanh Thuấn, Hương Hạnh, Phạm Quang Trung, Nông Trung Bộ...	Hải Phòng tuổi thơ tôi (Haiphong My Childhood) by Huy Hùng & Thúy Lan	Drama, Slice-of-Life, Family, Romance	Produced in 1998–1999. Adapted from Lê Lựu's novel of the same name. The cast changes with each stages of the plot.
1995; Oct	Sông Hồng reo (Red River Rising)	3 (90′)	HAVISCO	Nguyễn Hữu Luyện, Trần Trung Nhàn (directors); Nguyễn Bắc, Huy Bảo (writers); Như Quỳnh, Bùi Bài Bình, Tiến Đạt, Hương Dung, Thanh Tâm, Quốc Tuấn, Kim Cúc, Minh Thu, Hữu Độ, Hoàng Long, Thùy Dương, Duy Nhượng, Văn Chu, Hữu Ngọ, Thu Hoài, Hoàng Hà, Đăng Khoa...	Instrumental only: Tiến về Hà Nội (Towards to Hanoi); Composed by Văn Cao Hà Nội ơi! Một trái tim hồng (Hanoi, A Ruddy Heart); Composed by Nguyễn Đức Toàn	Historical, Drama, War	Celebrating the Hanoi Liberation Day
1996; Dec	Sống mãi với thủ đô (Forever Our Capital)	6 (90′)	HAVISCO	Lê Đức Tiến, Nguyễn Thế Vĩnh (directors); Lê Phương, Trịnh Thanh Nhã (writers); Trung Hiếu, Phạm Cường, Khánh Huyền, Phú Thăng, Hoàng Lan, Xuân Tùng, Quách Thu Phương, Quang Đại, Ngọc Thư, Bá Anh, Anh Huy, Tuấn Hải, Anh Quân, Ngọc Thành, Tùng Dương, Thanh Bình, An Quý, Minh Thu, Hoa Thúy, Mai Thu Huyền, Quốc Trị, Thu Hương, Văn Quý, Đức Thịnh, Thanh Dương, Hữu Độ, Đức Trung, Cát Trần Tùng, Quỳnh Dương, Việt Quân, Tiến Cường, Quốc Anh, Việt Thắng, Sĩ Tiến, Đức Hiệp, Đăng Khoa, Trung Anh, Trần Văn Tự, Phạm Hồng Minh, Duy Thanh, Tuyết Mai, Tuyết Liên, Ngọc Lan, Dương Quảng, Thanh Chi, Đức Sơn, Trần Nhượng, Đỗ Kỷ, Bình Trọng, Tiến Hợi...	Thủ đô khói lửa - instrumental (The Capital On Fire); Composed by Hoàng Hà Chiến sĩ Việt Nam (Vietnam Soldier); Composed by Văn Cao; Performed by VOV's choir	Historical, Drama, War, Romance	Based on Nguyễn Huy Tưởng's novel of the same name and theatrical script 'Lũy hoa'. Celebrating 50 Years of Nationwide Resistance Day. Each episode has its own name.

== #T ==
Broadcast	Title	Eps.	Prod.	Cast and crew	Theme song(s)	Genre	Notes
2013; Oct (Early released)	Thái sư Trần Thủ Độ (Great Tutor Trần Thủ Độ)	34	Feature Film Studio I	Đào Duy Phúc (director); Nguyễn Mạnh Tuấn (writer); Thiên Bảo, Lã Thanh Huyền, Hứa Vĩ Văn, Lan Hương, Hoàng Dũng, Mạnh Cường, Nguyễn Hải, Trần Đức, Viết Liên, Bùi Bài Bình, Đỗ Kỷ, Chí Trung, Chu Hùng, Cường Việt, Văn Báu, Tạ Minh Thảo, Bá Anh, Xuân Trường, Võ Thành Tâm, Thu Hà, Thu Hương, Tạ Vũ Thu, Bích Ngọc, Quỳnh Trang, Thanh Hoài, Mai Chi, Minh Phương, Phan Trí Tuệ, Vũ Phan Anh, Mai Như Quỳnh, Đào Hạnh Đan, Minh Đức, Linh Huệ, Minh Nguyệt, Đào Văn Bích, Trịnh Văn Huy, Vũ Văn Trung, Hoàng Hải, Hạnh Lê...	Tình ngút ngàn đau (Love with Immense Pain) by Trọng Tấn Con hạc vàng (Golden Crane) by Tùng Dương	Period, Historical, Drama	Produced in 2010 in order to celebrate 1000 Years of Thăng Long-Hà Nội. Officially released on VTV1 2 weeks later.
	Thời gian trong ống nứa (Time in Bamboo Tube)	2 (75′)	HanoiTV's Literature & Art Committee	Trung Trung Đỉnh (writer); Minh Ngọc, Hoàng Công, Ngọc Điệp, Quang Anh, Duy Đông, Hà Vinh, Hoàng Hà, Nguyễn Trung, Tấn Hưng, Ngọc Vinh, Thanh Hiền, Thu Trang...		Drama	
2001	Thương yêu (Loving)	1 (72′)	HanoiTV's Literature & Art Committee	Lê Lực (director); Nguyễn Văn Thưởng (writer); Minh Hằng, Trung Anh, Quốc Khánh, Đức Dũng, Đào Thị Loan, Phạm Hùng, Thành An, Anh Quân, Hằng Nga, Mai Liên, Hồng Diệp, Hữu Mười...		Drama, Family, Marriage, Scholastic	
1998; 27 Jan	Tình đời (Love & Life)	1		Đỗ Thanh Hải (director); Trần Hạnh, Hoàng Dũng, Tùng Dương, Hoa Thúy		Drama, Slice-of-Life	Airs on 29th Dec Lunar Year as a Tết drama
1997	Tình nghĩa vợ chồng (Marital Bond)	1 (95′)	HAVISCO	Nguyễn Hữu Luyện (director & writer); Đức Sơn, Như Quỳnh, Trần Đức, Trịnh Thịnh, Hoàng Duy...		Marriage, Drama	Based on Dương Dương Hảo's story
1998	Trái tim phiêu bạt (Wandering Heart)	1 (85′)	HAVISCO	Phương Dung (director); Phan Cao Toại (writer); Chiều Xuân, Thúy Phương, Hoa Chiến, Thành An, Thanh Vân, Thế Bình, Trần Chí Trung, Việt Thắng, Đức Trung, Kim Nhung, Nguyễn Chiến, Kim Anh, Ngọc Điệp, Bích Vân, Mậu Hòa, Văn Phượng, Quốc Đạt, Thanh Trang, Khôi Nguyên...		Drama, Medical	
	Tuổi thơ trở lại (Childhood Returns)	1 (88′)	HanoiTV	Đỗ Minh Tuấn (director); Diệp Vân, Đỗ Minh Tuấn (writers); Trần Hạnh, Tấn Nam, Phú Đôn, Danh Thái, Thiên Kiều, Đình Chiến, Khôi Nguyên, Thanh Tùng, Minh Tuấn, Thành An, Thanh Dũng...		Drama	
	Tường lửa Tràng An (Trang An Firewall)	45	HaNoiTV	Nguyễn Trung Sơn, Trần Thái Thuỷ (directors); Nguyễn Trung Sơn, Vũ Liêm, Đoàn Minh Anh, Đỗ Hảo, Đoàn Hiển (writers); Hoàng Hải, Doãn Quốc Đam, Thùy Anh, Quỳnh Châu, Nguyễn Long Vũ, Trương Hoàng, Ngọc Tản, Nguyễn Thanh Bình, Thanh Tú, Lưu Duy Khánh, Trọng Minh, Trịnh Mai Nguyên, Thùy Liên, Phạm Anh Tuấn, Quỳnh Dương, Hồng Liên, Hoàng Văn Huy, Việt Anh, Ngọc Minh, Đức Thắng, Diệp Thanh Phong, Minh Hiếu, Phạm Tất Thành, Tiến Dũng, Lương Đức Thắng...	Trung tướng Nguyễn Thanh Tùng (Lieutenant General Nguyen Thanh Tung) by Hoàng Hồng Ngọc	Crime, Political	Celebrating the 80th anniversary of People's Public Security force.

== #Ư ==
Broadcast	Title	Eps.	Prod.	Cast and crew	Theme song(s)	Genre	Notes
2000	Ước nguyện trước hoàng hôn (Desire Before Sunset)	2 (85′)	HAVISCO	Trần Bích Ngọc, Trần Trung Nhàn (directors); Trần Gia Thái (writer); Thúy Ngần, Thùy Linh, Quốc Khánh, Ngọc Thoa, Mai Hương, Lan Hương 'Bông', Tạ Minh Thảo, Chí Công, Thu An, Kim Chung, Vân Anh, Trần Hùng, Trịnh Mai Nguyên, Thanh Hiền, Duy Thanh, Hồng Sơn, Giang Vân, Khắc Tý, Minh Hạnh, Tuyết Liên, Tất Đạt...	'Ước nguyện trước hoàng hôn' theme song by Lan Anh	Drama, Family, Period	Adapted from Trần Gia Thái's short story 'Sắp đến rằm tháng Bảy'

== #V ==
Broadcast	Title	Eps.	Prod.	Cast and crew	Theme song(s)	Genre	Notes
	Vàng đen (Dark Gold)	1	HanoiTV's Literature & Art Committee			Drama	
1998	Vòng xoáy cuộc đời (The Vortex of Life)	2 (80′)	HAVISCO	Đặng Lưu Việt Bảo (director); Hoàng Nhung (writer); Trần Lực, Đức Hải, Hồng Hạnh, Bùi Bài Bình, Thanh Quý, Thanh Chi, Thu Lan, An, Việt Bảo, Quốc Trung, Tuấn Dũng...		Drama, Slice-of-Life, Family	
1995	Với anh, chiến tranh chưa kết thúc (To Him, The War Has Not Finished)	1 (75′)	HAVISCO	Nguyễn Khải Hưng (director); Hồ Bá Thuần (writer); Đỗ Kỷ, Trọng Trinh, Minh Thúy, Minh Quốc, Đức Trung, Tú Anh, Tuyết Mai, Tuyết Liên, Trần Dương, Ngọc Bích, Thúy Huyền, Trần Thái, Thúy Hương, Trần Kiên, Mạnh Hùng, Mạnh Hà, Quốc Tự, Thúy Liên...		Drama, Post-war, Slice-of-Life	
1998	Vùng hồ lặng sóng (Calm Lake Area)	2 (80′)	HAVISCO	Trần Lực (director); Trịnh Thanh Nhã (writer); Thanh Chi, Thu Thủy, Bùi Thị Hương, Mạc Ninh, Mai Hòa, Trịnh Mai Nguyên, Minh Tâm, Xuân Trường, Mạnh Kiểm, Thu Hương, Đỗ Hồng Quân, Nguyễn Văn Thuyên, Phạm Thu Hà, Nguyễn Thu Hằng, Lưu Văn Dũng, Trần Thu Huyền, Thùy Dương, Nguyễn Gia Hưng, Bằng Ngọc, Phạm Dũng Nhân...		Drama, Slice-of-Life	

== #X ==
Broadcast	Title	Eps.	Prod.	Cast and crew	Theme song(s)	Genre	Notes
2003	Xôn xao cửa thiền (Disturbed Meditation)	2 (65′)	HanoiTV's Literature & Art Committee	Hoàng Thanh Du (director); Bùi Văn Phương (writer); Hải Hà, Quốc Bình, Thanh Dương, Hạnh Đạt, Tuấn Quang, Nguyệt Minh, Thanh Nga, Ngọc Trung, Xuân Đồng, Hoàng Thanh Giang...		Drama, Romance, Religious	

== See also ==
- List of dramas broadcast by Vietnam Television (VTV)
- List of dramas broadcast by Vietnam Digital Television (VTC)
- List of programmes broadcast by Hanoi Radio Television

== Notes ==
- HAVISCO is short for Hanoi Audio Visual Company (Vietnamese: Công ty nghe nhìn Hà Nội), a subunit of Hanoi Radio Television
