= List of VTV dramas broadcast in 2014 =

This is a list of VTV dramas released in 2014. All times are in UTC+7.

←2013 - 2014 - 2015→

== VTV Special Tet dramas ==
These are short dramas airs on VTV1 & VTV3 during Tet Holiday.

Broadcast	Title	Eps.	Prod.	Cast and crew	Theme song(s)	Genre	Notes
31 Jan-3 Feb	Lấy chồng trước Tết (Get Married Before Tet)	4	VFC	Phạm Thanh Phong (director & writer); Thanh Dương, Phương Oanh, Bá Anh, Thanh Lâm, Nguyệt Hằng...		Comedy, Romance	Airs from 20:05 to 21:00, 1st-4th Tet holiday on VTV1
30 Jan-2 Feb	Thầy đổi nghề (Phony Fortunetellers)	4	V-Art Films	Nguyễn Dương (director); Nguyễn Nga (writer); Việt Anh, Hùng Cửu Long, Huy Khánh, Sam (Hà My), Hiếu Hiền, Phương Hằng, Tấn Bo, Bá Thắng, Nguyễn Dương, Uyên Trinh...	Xuân đến xuân vui (Spring Is Coming, Spring Is Happy) by Dương Uyên Thy	Comedy	Airs from 18:00 to 18:55, 30th to 3rd Tet holiday on VTV3

== VTV1 Weeknight Prime-time dramas ==
=== Monday-Wednesday dramas ===
These dramas air from 20:35 to 21:30, Monday to Wednesday on VTV1.

Broadcast	Title	Eps.	Prod.	Cast and crew	Theme song(s)	Genre	Notes
20 Jan-26 May	Nơi chốn ta quay về (Where We Come Back)	42	VnFilm	Lê Minh (director); Lê Anh Thúy (writer); Hoàng Hải, Đinh Y Nhung, Mai Huỳnh, Minh Thư, Huy Cường, Văn Thênh, Kiều Chinh, Đoàn Thanh Tài, Hoàng Thiên Long, Quang Thái...	Thời gian dẫn lối (Time Leads The Way) by Huỳnh Tấn Minh	Drama, Family, Political	
27 May-21 Jul	Con thuyền số phận (The Boat of Fate)	24	VFC	Trần Trọng Khôi, Trần Quốc Trọng (directors); Lê Hồng Lam (writer); Hồng Đăng, Đỗ Kỷ, Trần Quốc Trọng, Khuất Quỳnh Hoa, Lê Trang, Thiện Tùng, Bá Anh...		Drama	
22 July-7 Oct	Bánh đúc có xương (Stepmothers)	33	Lasta Films	Đặng Thái Huyền (director); Nguyễn Thu Hà, Hà Thu Hà (writers); Đức Khuê, Phan Ngọc Lan, Minh Châu, Diệu Hương, Nguyệt Hằng, Đỗ Kỷ, Lý Thanh Kha, Phạm Hồng Minh, Linh Huệ, Đỗ Hà Anh...	Có lẽ chúng ta đã sai (Maybe We Were Wrong) by Bích Phương; Để mẹ luôn có con (For Me To Have You Always) by Hoàng Nghi Lâm	Drama, Family, Marriage	
8 Oct 2014- 5 Jan 2015	Đại ca U70 (U70 Boss)	30	Dong A Pictures	Phi Tiến Sơn (director); Giáp Kiều Hưng, Nguyễn Thu Thủy, Trịnh Khánh Hà, Đan Phượng, Cẩm Hằng (writers); Chánh Tín, Diễm My, Mai Dũng, Tuyết Thu, Minh Ngân, Khả Như, My Trần, Bella Mai, Huỳnh Trường Thịnh, Nguyễn Châu, Nguyễn Hậu, Mai Trần...	Bến bình an (Peaceful Dock) by Chánh Tín	Family, Romance, Drama	

=== Thursday-Friday dramas ===
These dramas air from 20:35 to 21:30, Thursday and Friday on VTV1.

Broadcast	Title	Eps.	Prod.	Cast and crew	Theme song(s)	Genre	Notes
24 Apr-18 Jul	Đường lên Điện Biên (Road to Điện Biên)	25	VTV and VFS	Bùi Tuấn Dũng (director); Từ Nguyên Trực, Khuất Quang Thụy (writers); Mạnh Trường, Huyền Trang, Hoàng Hải, Diễm Hương, Mạnh Hưng, Quách Xuân Thông, Thanh Hương, Khương Đức Thuận, Văn Báu, Mai Ngọc Căn, Thanh Hiền, Hứa Khải, Bùi Sỹ Tự, Đăng Khoa, Năng Tùng, Đoàn Khánh Ly, Nguyễn Văn Lộc, Nguyễn Trọng, Lâm Na Anh, Phạm Hương Anh, Đoàn Nam, Vũ Ba Duy, Hương Vũ, Thanh Xuân, Tiến Mộc, Lê Xuân Khôi, Nông Dũng Nam, Quang Duy, Nguyễn Thị Lan, Victor, Tạ Hương Lan, Vân Thường, Trịnh Huyền, Bùi Oanh, Phạm Vân Anh, Phan Trí Tuệ, Văn Quang, Việt Cường, Nguyễn Huy, Đinh Hoàng Yến, Hoàng Tùng, Xuân Nông, Mai Hương, Ngọc Bích, Đức Huy, Trần Minh Phước, Cầm Văn Chung...	Đường lên phía trước (Way Up to the Front) by Tiến Minh, Duy Quyết & Quang Nghĩa	Historical, War, Drama	To celebrate Reunification Day & Dien Bien Victory, Ep 2 to Ep 12 air all weeknight (1-16 May) except celebration days. Based on novels of Đường lên Tây Bắc (Road to the Northwest) & Đại đội trưởng của tôi (My Captain) by Mai Vui.
24 July-4 Dec	Bão qua làng (Stormy Village)	30	VFC	Trần Quốc Trọng, Lê Mạnh (directors); Xuân Trường, Khánh Trình (writers); Trần Hạnh, Quốc Khánh, Công Lý, Thanh Nhàn, Đình Chiến, Tuyết Liên, Hồ Liên, Phú Đôn, Duy Thanh, Thùy Liên, Quang Thắng, Hán Văn Tình, Thu Hiền, Tiến Mộc, Thúy Hà, Quỳnh Trang, Vĩnh Xương, Thanh Tú, Tạ Am, Mậu Hòa...	Nét quê (Rural Feature) by Trần Thụy Miên	Rural, Political, Drama	
5 Dec 2014- 27 May 2015	Mưa bóng mây (Sunshower)	37	VFC	Trọng Trinh (director); Phạm Kim Ngân (writer); Thúy Hằng, Thúy Hà, Thanh Hòa, Trung Hiếu, Trọng Trinh, Huy Trinh, Bình Minh, Kim Ngọc...	Những điều không thuộc về ước mơ (Things That's Not About Dream) by Ngọc Anh; Điều con muốn nói (What I Want To Say) by Thùy Chi	Drama, Marriage	Airs on-and-off due to broadcast schedule of special events. Airs on Wed to Fri since March 2015. Based on true stories. Formerly: Phía sau khung cửa (Behind the Window)

== VTV3 Weeknight Prime-time dramas ==
=== Monday-Tuesday dramas ===
These dramas air from 21:30 to 22:20, Monday and Tuesday on VTV3.

Starting in April 2014, the time slot "Monday to Wednesday" was changed to "Monday and Tuesday".

Broadcast	Title	Eps.	Prod.	Cast and crew	Theme song(s)	Genre	Notes
17 Mar-7 July	Vừa đi vừa khóc (Walking Crying)	36	BHD	Vũ Ngọc Đãng (director & writer); Minh Hằng, Lương Mạnh Hải, Lê Thiện, Nhã Phương, Ninh Dương Lan Ngọc, La Quốc Hùng, Bảo Anh, Thanh Thủy, Phương Thanh, Hiếu Hiền, Tùng Yuki...	Vừa đi vừa khóc (Walking Crying) & Nắng (Sunshine) by Minh Thư	Romance, Comedy	First 9 eps air on Mon to Wed
8 Jul-19 Nov	Dấu chân du mục (Wandering Footprint)	40	Leo Media	Đinh Thái Thụy (director & writer); Linh Sơn, Lê Bê La, Thanh Duy, Kha Ly, Hữu Thành, Đông Dương, David Phạm, Như Yến, Minh Anh, Thu Hiền, Hoàng Mập, Thùy Linh, Phương Bằng, Thạch Kim Long, Phạm Hồng, Thanh Tú, Kim Khánh...		Drama	
24 Nov 2014- 10 Aug 2015	Đam mê nghiệt ngã (Severe Passion)	80	BHD	Nguyễn Minh Chung (director); Thùy Linh (writer); Trịnh Kim Chi, Lê Bình, Huy Khánh, Trương Thế Vinh, Nhan Phúc Vinh, Nguyệt Ánh, Minh Thảo, Tường Vi, Văn Anh, Phương Mai...		Drama	First 12 eps air on Mon to Thu. Based on Colombian telenovela Pasión de Gavilanes.

=== Wednesday–Thursday dramas ===
These dramas air from 21:30 to 22:20, Wednesday and Thursday on VTV3.

Starting in April 2014, the time slot "Thursday and Friday" was changed to "Wednesday and Thursday".

Broadcast	Title	Eps.	Prod.	Cast and crew	Theme song(s)	Genre	Notes
27 Mar-17 Jul	Yêu đến tận cùng (Love to the End)	34	VFC	Đỗ Đức Thịnh (director); Nguyễn Hồng Trâm, Trịnh Vĩnh Hà (writers); Anh Thư, Cao Minh Đạt, Linh Sơn, Nhung Kate, Đỗ Đức Thịnh, Thanh Thúy, Vương Nhật Huy, Long Đẹp Trai...	Nơi xa cuối trời (Far End Of Heaven) by Hoàng Thu Trang & Tuấn Quỳnh; Nhưng anh vẫn đợi (But I Still Await) by Hoàng Thu Trang & Nguyễn Long	Drama, Romance	First 4 eps air on Thu-Fri
23 Jul-20 Nov	Lời thì thầm từ quá khứ (Whisper from the Past)	35	VFC	Mai Hồng Phong (director); Vũ Liêm, Phương Nhung, Tố Mai (writers); Phan Minh Huyền, Tiến Lộc, Thanh Sơn, Chí Nhân, Phương Oanh, Vũ Thủy, Diệp Bích, Vũ Đình Thân, Cường Việt, Hải Yến, Công Dũng, Thu Phương, Kim Loan, Huyền Thanh, Phạm Dương, Trương Việt Thường, Kim Hùng, Hải Anh, Khắc Trịnh, Ngô Long, Minh Cúc, Khuất Quỳnh Hoa, Văn Quan, Quang Vịnh, Sỹ Lai...	Tìm lại tình yêu (Retrieve Love) by Dương Hoàng Yến	Drama, Mystery, Crime	
17 Dec 2014- 23 Apr 2015	Tuổi thanh xuân (Forever Young)	36	VFC and CJ E&M	Nguyễn Khải Anh, Myung Hyun-woo, Bùi Tiến Huy (directors); Kang Ji-sook, Nguyễn Thu Thủy (writers); Nhã Phương, Kang Tae-oh, Hồng Đăng, Kim Tuyến, Shin Hye-sun, Lee Kyu-bok, Son Jong-hak, Lee Ah-hyun, Roh Haeng-ha, Shin Jae-ha, Việt Anh, Yoo Jae-myung, Trọng Trinh, Minh Hòa...	Tuổi thanh xuân (Youth) by Lưu Hương Giang; Cứ thế (And So On) by Hà Anh Tuấn; Đến bên em (Come Beside Me) by Hồ Quỳnh Hương	Romance, Drama, Youth	Filming in Vietnam & South Korea

=== Friday dramas ===
New time slot was opened in April 2014 but closed after 1 series.

This drama air from 21:25 to 23:00, Friday on VTV3.

Broadcast	Title	Eps.	Prod.	Cast and crew	Theme song(s)	Genre	Notes
11 Apr-11 Jul	Bếp hát (The Kitchen Musical Vietnam)	13	VTV and BHD	Phan Gia Nhật Linh, Danny Đỗ (directors); Thái Hà (adapter); Đức Trí (music director); Tấn Lộc (choreographer); Lam Trường, Tú Vi, Thành Lộc, Trà My, Văn Anh, Diệp Lâm Anh, Lê Mi Lan, Hakoota Dũng Hà, Annie Huỳnh Anh, Anh Tài, Ya Ya Trương Nhi, Lân Nhã, Will, Quang Đăng, Phương Thanh...		Drama, Musical, Comedy	Based on Singaporean TV series The Kitchen Musical. Delay 1 ep due to special event (9 May).

== VTV3 Rubic 8 dramas ==
These dramas air from 15:00 to 15:50, Saturday and Sunday on VTV3 as a part of the program Rubic 8.

Broadcast	Title	Eps.	Prod.	Cast and crew	Theme song(s)	Genre	Notes
8 Feb-4 May	Heo may về qua phố (Breeze Through the Town)	26	VFC	Nguyễn Danh Dũng (director); Phạm Thi Phương Thảo, Nguyễn Thị Vân Anh, Đặng Thị Linh, Nguyễn Ngân Hà (writers); Tiến Đạt, Chiều Xuân, Minh Tuyết, Trung Hiếu, Thúy Hà, Ngọc Thoa, Minh Thảo, Xuân Huy, Linh Chi, Mai Chi, Quốc Anh (B Trần), Lê Phương Anh, Yến My, Phú Thăng, Đào Hoàng Yến, Hồng Hạnh, Công Lý...	Heo may về qua phố (Breeze Through the Town) by Mai Hoa	Drama	Adapted from the novel of 'Mắc cạn' (Strand) by Mạc Văn Chung
10 May-31 Aug	Những kẻ hai mặt (Two-faced People)	34	VFC	Đặng Tất Bình (director); Đặng Minh Châu (writer); Trung Dũng, Hồng Vân, Việt Cường, Hồng Châu, Mai Thu Huyền, Minh Hoàng, Thúy Ngân, Kha Ly, Hồ Giang Bảo Sơn, Mai Chinh...	Dẫu từng lầm lỗi (Despite the Lapse) by Phan Tuấn Anh	Drama, Crime	
6 Sep 2014- 4 Jan 2015	Trái tim có nắng (Sunshine In My Heart)	26	VFC	Bùi Tiến Huy, Nguyễn Đức Hiếu (directors); Hoàng Hồng Hạnh (writer); Phan Minh Huyền, Phạm Anh Tuấn, Lê Phương Anh, Xuân Phúc, Minh Hòa, Lan Hương 'Bông', Đỗ Kỷ, Ngọc Bích, Khôi Nguyên, An Ninh, Tạ Am, Duy Long, Mr. A, Phan Thắng, Mai Anh, Hà Min, Trịnh Huyền, Hải Khoa, Khuất Quỳnh Hoa, Thành HuyMe, Tiến Huy, Thu Hương, Hoàng Lan, Sùng Lãm...	Em muốn (I Want) & Có bao giờ anh biết (Do You Ever Know) by Ái Phương	Romance, Drama, Youth	

== VTV6 Weeknight Late-time dramas ==
These dramas air from 22:00 to 22:30, Monday to Friday on VTV6.

The time slot was paused during the time of 2014 FIFA World Cup. It was closed and not opened again after 2014 AFF Suzuki Cup.

Broadcast	Title	Eps.	Prod.	Cast and crew	Theme song(s)	Genre	Notes
24 Feb-9 May	Khi ta nói dối (When We Lie)	55; Original: 38	Lasta Film	Dương Nam Quan (director); Thanh Liên (writer); Phương Khánh, Trí Quang, Lê Bình, Thanh Nam, Hoài An, Hứa Minh Đạt, Lý Thanh Thảo, Thu Tuyết, Bảo Trí, Ngọc Lan, Ngọc Tưởng, Thụy Mười...	Chiếc bánh diệu kỳ (The Magical Cake) by Nghi Khánh	Comedy, Romance	Followed by Của để dành (1998) playback & World Cup
15 Jul-8 Sep	Vitamin tình yêu (Vitamin Love)	38; Original: 26	V-Art Films	Lê Bảo Trung (director); Nguyễn Thị Vân Anh (writer); Ngọc Thuận, Trương Quỳnh Anh, Miên Viễn, Đồng Thanh Phong, Vang Quốc Hải, Phương Khánh, Kim Dung, Tùng Haru, Hiền Mai, Âu Thiên Phú, Trịnh Kim Chi, Hà Linh...	Vitamin tình yêu (Vitamin Love) by Trương Quỳnh Anh; Ca khúc tình yêu (Song of Love) by Vang Quốc Hải & Trương Quỳnh Anh	Drama, Romance	
9 Sep-5 Dec	Hoa phượng trắng (White Flamboyant): Pt. 1: Nước mắt con gái (Girls' Tears); Pt. 2: Hào quang mong manh (Fragile Aura); Pt. 3: Tình yêu học trò (Student's Love); Pt. 4: Chúng ta là người lớn (We're Adults)	68; Pt.1: 14e Pt.2: 20e Pt.3: 12e Pt.4: 12e	VTV and Trần Gia Studio	Lưu Ngọc Hà (director); Lưu Ngọc Hà, Cẩm Tú, Phương Hiền (stories); Mỹ Dung, Khánh Hòa (writers); Anh Đào, Lục Diệp, Thùy Liên, Đức Khuê, Thanh Bình, Chí Trung, Lý Chí Huy, Bảo Linh, Lưu Văn Hoàng, Hoài Anh, Tuấn Thắng, Bá Anh... (pt.1 cast); Trà My, Minh Trí, Cao Dương, Viết Thái, Thu Hường, Xuân Thông, Đàm Hằng, Lan Anh, Kiên Hoàng, Thúy Mùi, Diệu Hương, Hải Anh, Phương Oanh... (pt.2 cast); Sam Hà My, Baggio, Lan Hương, Hương Dung... (pt.3 cast); Nhã Phương, Phạm Anh Tuấn, Mai Chi, Duy Long, Minh Hòa, Thế Bình, Lục Diệp, Diệu Linh... (pt.4 cast)	Hoa phượng trắng (White Flamboyant) by Văn Mai Hương Là con gái thật tuyệt (Being a Girl is Great) by Lê Cát Trọng Lý	Drama, Coming-of-Age, Scholastic	A series comprises 4 independent miniseries. Last series airs on VTV6 late-night time slot.

== See also ==
- List of dramas broadcast by Vietnam Television (VTV)
- List of dramas broadcast by Hanoi Radio Television (HanoiTV)
- List of dramas broadcast by Vietnam Digital Television (VTC)
