= List of VTV dramas broadcast in 2013 =

This is a list of VTV dramas released in 2013.

←2012 - 2013 - 2014→

== VTV Special Tet dramas ==
These are short dramas airs on VTV1 & VTV3 during Tet Holiday.

Broadcast	Title	Eps.	Prod.	Cast and crew	Theme song(s)	Genre	Notes
10-13 Feb	Vận may bất ngờ (Unexpected Good Luck)	4	VFC	Trịnh Lê Phong (director); Hà Anh Thu (writer); Chí Trung, Kim Oanh, Tùng Dương, Viết Thái, Huyền Trang, Hải Anh, Ngọc Quỳnh, Diệu Thuần, Xuân Huy, Anh Thư, Thanh Hòa, Ba Duy, Thanh Bình, Kim Anh, Đức Ngạn...	Yêu em nhiều (Love you much) by Anh Quân Idol	Drama, Comedy	Airs from 20:05 to 21:00, 1st-4th Tet holiday on VTV1
11-14 Feb	Trốn Tết (Hiding From Tet)	4	V-Art Films	Nguyễn Duy Võ Ngọc (director); Huy Khánh, Tuấn Bo, Thanh Tùng, Hà Linh, Kiều Linh...		Comedy, Crime	Airs from 21:15 to 22:00, 2nd to 5th Tet holiday on VTV3

== VTV1 Weeknight Prime-time dramas ==
=== Monday-Wednesday dramas ===
These dramas air from 20:35 to 21:30, Monday to Wednesday on VTV1.

Broadcast	Title	Eps.	Prod.	Cast and crew	Theme song(s)	Genre	Notes
6 Mar-28 May	Không thể gục ngã (Can Not Fall)	33	FaFilm HCMC	Bùi Cường (director); Giáp Kiều Hưng, Trịnh Đan Phượng (writers); Phạm Thiên Thanh, Chánh Nghĩa, Trọng Nhân, Nhật Trường, Ôn Bích Hằng, Quách Tĩnh, Thanh Tân, Phương Hằng...	Đi tìm ngày xanh (Go Find A Good Day) & Hạnh phúc tuyệt vời (Great Happiness) by Văn Tứ Quý	Drama	
29 May-17 Jul	Huyền thoại 1C (Legend of 1C)	22	Tây Nam Film (TNP Prod.)	Nguyễn Thanh Vân (director); Đoàn Minh Tuấn (writer); Thiên Bảo, Nhã Uyên, Diệu Thúy, Thanh Nghĩa, Ngọc Quý, Uyên My, Lưu Quốc Quang, Trương Khả Ly, Thanh Xuân, Mai Duyên, Cas Tuấn Anh, Lê Thanh Bước, Phi Thiên Vũ, Bùi Quang Đạt, Hương Ngân, Mỹ Hằng, Hoài Ân, Phan Hồng Tuyết, Lê Vinh, Kiều Phương, Hoa Việt Bảo, Minh Nguyệt, Nguyễn Tấn Sỉ, Trần Lê Tâm, Hồ Văn Thọ...		Historical, Drama	Ordered by Ministry of Culture, Sports and Tourism
22 July-21 Oct	Giấc mơ hạnh phúc (A Dream of Happiness)	37	VFS	Bùi Huy Thuần (director); Nguyễn Thu Hà, Hà Thu Hà, Lại Minh Nguyệt (writers); Hoàng Hải, Khuất Quỳnh Hoa, Thu Hương, Phương Oanh, Tùng Dương, Ngọc Quỳnh, Phạm Hồng Minh, Minh Tuấn, Chi Pu, Mạnh Quân, Hồng Quang, Đào Hoàng Yến, Tiến Minh, Phương Linh, Minh Châu, Minh Nguyệt, Thanh Quý, Tiến Mộc, Vũ Hải, Thu Nhàn, Thiên Kiều, Tạ Thu...	Nơi tình yêu ở lại (Where The Love Stays); Opening Version by Kim Oanh Nguyễn; Ending Version by Bùi Anh Tuấn	Drama, Marriage	
22 Oct 2013- 15 Jan 2014	Thái sư Trần Thủ Độ (Great Tutor Trần Thủ Độ)	34	Feature Film Studio I	Đào Duy Phúc (director); Nguyễn Mạnh Tuấn (writer); Thiên Bảo, Lã Thanh Huyền, Hứa Vĩ Văn, Lan Hương, Hoàng Dũng, Mạnh Cường, Nguyễn Hải, Trần Đức, Viết Liên, Bùi Bài Bình, Đỗ Kỷ, Chí Trung, Chu Hùng, Cường Việt, Văn Báu, Tạ Minh Thảo, Bá Anh, Xuân Trường, Võ Thành Tâm, Nguyễn Thu Hà, Thu Hương, Tạ Vũ Thu, Bích Ngọc, Quỳnh Trang, Thanh Hoài, Mai Chi, Minh Phương, Phan Trí Tuệ, Vũ Phan Anh, Mai Như Quỳnh, Đào Hạnh Đan, Minh Đức, Linh Huệ, Minh Nguyệt, Đào Văn Bích, Trịnh Văn Huy, Vũ Văn Trung, Hoàng Hải, Hạnh Lê...	Tình ngút ngàn đau (Love with Immense Pain) by Trọng Tấn Con hạc vàng (Golden Crane) by Tùng Dương	Period, Historical, Drama	Produced in 2010 in order to celebrate 1000 Years of Thăng Long-Hà Nội. Early released on HanoiTV1 since 4 Oct.

=== Thursday-Friday dramas ===
These dramas air from 20:35 to 21:30, Thursday and Friday on VTV1.

Broadcast	Title	Eps.	Prod.	Cast and crew	Theme song(s)	Genre	Notes
21 Mar-18 Aug	Ngược sóng (Against the Waves)	38	Cat Tien Sa	Lê Cung Bắc (director); Trịnh Thanh Nhã, Lê Anh Thúy (writers); Hoàng Phúc, Phương Mai, Mai Huỳnh, Nguyễn Hậu, Mai Sơn Lâm, Lê Thu An, Quốc Tân, Thúy Phượng, Lân Bích, Lê Bình, Thành Lũy, Trường Thịnh, Minh Hoàng, Lisa Hương, Thiên Nga, Đoàn Mai Phương, Nguyệt Minh, Bích Hằng, Huỳnh Sơn Thái, ...	Vượt sóng (Past the Waves) & Ngược sóng (Against the Waves) by Tuyết Mai	Political, Drama	Adapted from the novel of 'Canh Năm' by Lê Thành Chơn
9 Aug-5 Dec	Trò đời (Human Comedy)	30	VFC and Hodafilm	Phạm Nhuệ Giang (director); Lê Anh Thúy, Trịnh Thanh Nhã (writers); Minh Hằng, Bảo Thanh, Việt Bắc, Thúy An, Thiện Tùng, Phú Đôn, Tô Dũng, Chiến Thắng, Đào Hoàng Yến, Thanh Dương, Minh Phương, Quốc Anh, Mai Chi, Lâm Tùng, Quang Thắng, Hồng Lê, Tạ Am...	Đời đáng chán (How Boring This Life) by ca trù singer Bạch Vân	Period, Drama	Based on novels and short stories: 'Số đỏ', 'Kỹ nghệ lấy Tây', 'Cơm thầy cơm cô', 'Làm đĩ', 'Ánh sáng kinh thành' by Vũ Trọng Phụng
6 Dec 2013- 18 April 2014	Làng ma 10 năm sau (Ghosty Village 10 Years Later)	33	VTV and TVPlus	Nguyễn Hữu Phần (director & writer); Phùng Hoàng Cường, Trần Anh Tuấn, Ngọc Quỳnh, Thúy An, Kim Oanh, Trung Hiếu, Đỗ Bạch Diện, Lý Thanh Kha, Phạm Tuấn Quang, Bùi Bá Thiện, Ngọc Hoa, Thanh Tú, Anh Tuấn, Tùng Anh, Chí Dương, Dịu Hương, Thủy Tiên, Thu Hằng, Kim Ngân, Minh Tiến...	Đêm cuối cùng của mùa đông (The Last Night Of Winter) by Minh Chuyên	Rural, Drama, Political	Following up 'Ma làng' (2007)

== VTV3 Weeknight Prime-time dramas ==
=== Monday-Wednesday dramas ===
These dramas air from 21:30 to 22:20, Monday to Wednesday on VTV3.

Broadcast	Title	Eps.	Prod.	Cast and crew	Theme song(s)	Genre	Notes
7 Jan-9 Apr	Đi qua dĩ vãng (To Pass the Bygones)	38	VTV and Blue Planet Films	Nguyễn Duy Võ Ngọc (director); Đặng Thanh, Thanh Tâm, Thoại Liên (writer); Chánh Tín, Thanh Thức, Thiên Hương, Hoàng Ny, Ngọc Tường, Oanh Kiều, Thùy Dương, Phúc An, Miên Viễn, Đào Anh Tuấn, Cao Thanh Danh, Minh Trí, Anh Tài, Anh Kiệt, Hồng Thủy, Trà My...	Đánh mất linh hồn (Losing My Soul) by Lâm Minh Huy; Ước mong quay về (Wishing to Come Back) by Đặng Thái Hà	Drama, Family	
10 Apr-8 Jul	Bí mật tam giác vàng (The Secret in Golden Triangle)	38	Lasta Film	Nguyễn Dương (director); Nguyễn Như Phong (writer); Mạnh Trường, Nhung Kate, Diễm Hằng, Tạ Minh Thảo, Văn Báu, Hồ Phong, Tùng Yuki, Hoàng Hải, Chí Công, Nguyễn Sanh, Chu Hùng, Diệu Thuần, Hoàng Yến, Minh Thắng, Bình Xuyên, Cao Minh Đạt, Phạm Minh Nguyệt...	Bí mật Tam Giác Vàng (The Secret in Golden Triangle); Opening Version by Kasim Hoàng Vũ; Ending Version by Văn Thắng	Crime, Drama, Action	Adapted from the novel of 'Liên minh tay ba ở Tam Giác Vàng' by Nguyễn Như Phong. Filming in Vietnam, Laos, Thailand & Myanmar
9 Jul-16 Sep	Váy hồng tầng 24 ('Pink Dress' on 24th Floor)	30	BHD	Nguyễn Minh Chung (director); Thái Hà (adapter); Diễm My, Huy Khánh, Minh Khuê, Hứa Vĩ Văn, Kim Hiền, Chi Bảo, Khánh My, Quốc Trường, Kyo York, Yumi Dương, Kiều Ngân, Huỳnh Long, Thúy Hạnh, Lan Phương, Lân Bích, Đàm Loan, Mã Trung...	Tango trao tay (Tango Hand-in-hand) by Văn Mai Hương	Drama, Romance, Office	Based on Chinese drama Unbeatable - Beauties Around
17 Sep-30 Dec	Khi yêu đừng hỏi tại sao (Passion Has No Question)	45	VTV and V-Art Films	Châu Huế (director); Hải Thiên Nam (writer); Tùng Haru, Bích Trâm, Mẫn Đức Kiên, Nguyễn Đình Thơ, Thanh Thủy, Ngọc Thơ, Trịnh Phương Đài, Hùng Cửu Long, Trần Lượng, Phạm Hồng, Thiên Hương, Cao Hoàng, Nguyễn Sanh, Mỹ Dung, Mã Trung...	Thôi về đi (Get Back) & Khi cơn mưa qua (When the Rain is Gone) by Ngọc Anh Idol	Drama	
31 Dec 2013- 12 Mar 2014	Chỉ có thể là yêu (It Must be Love)	32	VFC	Vũ Minh Trí (director); Nguyễn Thu Thủy, Giáp Kiều Hưng, Trịnh Đan Phượng, Trịnh Khánh Hà, Trịnh Cẩm Hằng (writers); Việt Anh, Linh Phương, Minh Hòa, Trần Đức, Hồng Đăng, Trần Chí Trung, Thạch Thu Huyền, Vũ Thu Hoài, Thu Phương, Thu Thuận, Thế Bình, Minh Phương, Thanh Sơn, Trí Tuệ...	Chỉ có thể là yêu (It Must be Love) by Minh Tiến	Drama, Romance	Adapted from the novel of the same name by Hân Như

=== Thursday-Friday dramas ===
These dramas air from 21:30 to 22:20, Thursday and Friday on VTV3.

Broadcast	Title	Eps.	Prod.	Cast and crew	Theme song(s)	Genre	Notes
14 Mar-26 Jul	Tình yêu không hẹn trước (Unpredicted Love)	40	VFC	Trọng Trinh, Bùi Tiến Huy (directors); Chu Thu Hằng, Trịnh Vĩnh Hà (writers); Việt Anh, Lã Thanh Huyền, Mạnh Cường, Quế Hằng, Lan Hương 'Bông', Phú Kiên, Minh Hằng, Minh Hương, Ngọc Quỳnh, Quỳnh Nga, Việt An, Đặng Loan...	Xa (Far) by Hương Tràm; Ta phải xa nhau (We Must be Apart) by Nguyễn Ngọc Anh; Sao anh cứ im lặng (Why're You Keeping Silent) by Dương Hoàng Yến	Drama, Romance	
1 Aug-1 Nov	Cảnh sát hình sự: Bản di chúc bí ẩn (Criminal Police: The Mystic Wills)	28	VFC	Trịnh Lê Phong (director); Nguyễn Long Khánh (writer); Linh Sơn, Minh Phương, Phan Anh, Đỗ Kỷ, Trần Tường, Sỹ Tiến, Mạnh Hưng, Bình Xuyên, Diễm Hương, Doãn Quốc Đam, Huyền Trang, Lan Hương 'Bông', Hoàng Tùng, Quỳnh Hoa, Lan Anh, Ngọc Dung, Thùy Dương, Khắc Tùng, Ánh Tuyết, Vũ Hải, Viết Liên, Văn Phú, Hồng Minh, Hải Anh, Đức Việt, Khôi Nguyên, Anh Dũng, Tiến Mộc...	Đến nơi bình yên (To a Quiet Place) by Lưu Hương Giang; Chỉ một lần vấp ngã (Only Once Fallen) by Bảo Trâm Idol	Crime, Drama, Family	
7 Nov 2013- 21 Mar 2014	Chạm tay vào nỗi nhớ (A Touch to Remember)	38	VFC	Vũ Hồng Sơn (director); Chu Thanh Hương (writer); Baggio, Diệp Anh, Tiến Lộc, Huyền Trang, Thanh Sơn, Hoàng Phương Anh, Văn Báu, Tạ Minh Thảo, Lê Hồng Quang, Ngọc Dương, Doãn Quốc Đam, Xuân Phúc, Duy Thanh, Sỹ Hoài...	Chạm tay vào nỗi nhớ (A Touch to Remember) by Hải Yến Idol	Romance, Crime, Scholastic, Youth	Formerly: Học viện cảnh sát (Police Academy)

== VTV3 Rubic 8 dramas ==
These dramas air from 15:00 to 15:50, Saturday and Sunday on VTV3 as a part of the program Rubic 8.

Broadcast	Title	Eps.	Prod.	Cast and crew	Theme song(s)	Genre	Notes
2 Mar-5 May	Hương ngọc lan (The Scent of Michelia)	20	VFC	Nguyễn Đức Hiếu (director); Hoàng Hồng Hạnh (writer); Mạnh Trường, Thu Quỳnh, Minh Trí, Hương Mai, Vũ Thu Hoài, Nguyệt Hằng, Thanh Dương, Duy Long, Mai Duyên, Cường Việt, Hải Yến, Thanh Tùng, Thu Trang, Hồ Liên, Thanh Bình, Thế Bình...	Rời xa mùa đông (Leaving the Winter) by Minh Chuyên & Tô Minh Đức	Drama, Romance	
11 May-18 Aug	Giọt nước rơi (The Falling Droplet)	30	VFC	Bùi Quốc Việt (director); Võ Thị Xuân Hà, Nguyễn Thị Vân Anh (writers); Hồng Đăng, Chi Pu, Trần Đức, Thanh Quý, Tạ Minh Thảo, Lệ Thu, Chi Hoa, Văn Hoàng, Chí Nhân, Bảo Thanh, Thúy An, Hoàng Anh Vũ, Hải Yến, Hoàng Tùng, Trọng Hùng, Xuân Trường, Mạnh Hà, Doãn Quốc Đam...	Nơi tình yêu kết thúc (Where the Love Ends) by Bùi Anh Tuấn	Romance, Drama, Crime	Adapted from the novel of 'Aquarius/ Chuyện dân gian ở thời đại chúng ta' by Đức Hoàng Formerly: Lạc lối (Lost Way)
24 Aug-10 Nov	Hoa nở trái mùa (Unseasonal Bloom)	22	VFC	Nguyễn Khải Anh, Nguyễn Đức Hiếu (directors); Chu Thu Hằng, Trịnh Vĩnh Hà (writers); Thanh Vân Hugo, Thùy Dương, Lưu Đê Ly, Hải Anh, Mạnh Trường, Thanh Sơn, Thu Hiền, Hương Dung, Quốc Anh, Thế Bình, Thu Hương, Trung Cường, Hải Yến, Hoàng Mai Anh, Huyền Trang, Hữu Độ, Mạnh Hà, Dương Mạc Yến My...	Dấu mưa (Trace of Rain) by Trung Quân Idol; Rung động (Stir) by Hoàng Thùy Linh	Drama, Romance	
16 Nov 2013- 2 Feb 2014	Sát thủ online (Online Assassin)	24	VFC	Nguyễn Mai Hiền (director); Tống Phương Dung (writer); Quang Minh, Bạch Quỳnh, Văn Báu, Thanh Quý, Tạ Am, Sĩ Hoài, Hải Anh, Ninh Trang, Chí Dương, Trọng Hùng, Xuân Thông, Phí Thùy Linh, Kim Ngọc, Tùng Anh, Duy Long, Anh Tuấn, Linh Rin, Anh Dũng, Hà Min, Ngô Lệ Quyên...	Dấu yêu trở về (Darling Comes Back) by Kasim Hoàng Vũ	Drama, Crime	Adapted from the novel of the same name by Nguyễn Xuân Thủy

== VTV6 Lemon Tea dramas ==
These dramas air from 19:15 to 20:00, Saturday and Sunday on VTV6 as a part of the program Lemon Tea (Vietnamese: Trà chanh). The time slot was closed after the drama Gái già xì-tin.

Broadcast	Title	Eps.	Prod.	Cast and crew	Theme song(s)	Genre	Notes
12 Jan-2 Mar	Cô hàng xóm rắc rối (Annoying Girl Next Door)	14	VFC	Bùi Tiến Huy, Phạm Gia Phương (directors); Phạm Ngọc Anh (writer); Phan Minh Huyền, Kiên Hoàng, Phạm Cường, Minh Hòa, Trọng Trinh, Quỳnh Tứ, Phương Linh, Nhật Linh, Hà Min, Duy Long...	Cô bạn hàng xóm (The Girl Next Door) by Dương Hoàng Yến	Romance, Comedy	
3 Mar-23 Jun	Đến từ giấc mơ (Coming From My Dream)	32	VFC	Đặng Tất Bình, Nguyễn Thế Vinh, Nguyễn Hoài Thu (directors); Xuân Tâm (writer); Tường Vi, Khương Thịnh, Bình Minh, Ái Châu, Bích Hằng, Hữu Luân, Khánh Huyền, Đồng Mỹ Vy, Bân Trâm, Mai Chinh, Thành Nhân, Hải Hùng, Châu Thế Tâm, Gia Bảo, Văn Thường, Hải Lý, Trần Tường...	Có lẽ (Perhaps) by Tô Minh Đức; Nỗi nhớ (Nostalgia) by Minh Hải & Nhật Thủy	Romance, Drama, Comedy	
29 Jun-28 Jul	Đi qua mùa nắng (Crossing Sunny Season)	6	VFC	Bùi Tiến Huy, Nguyễn Đức Hiếu (directors); Nguyễn Ngân Hà (writer); Diệp Anh, Vương Anh, Kiên Hoàng, Nguyễn Kim Oanh, Linh Chi, Vĩnh Xương...	Tạm biệt nhé (Farewell) by Bảo Trâm Idol	Scholastic, Drama	
3 Aug-7 Dec	Khi người đàn ông góa vợ bật khóc (When A Widower Bursts Into Tears)	36	VFC	Vũ Trường Khoa (director); Nguyễn Huỳnh Bảo Anh (writer); Công Lý, Quỳnh Trang, Hoàng Thu Trang, Nguyễn Trang, Mạnh Hưng, Anh Dũng, Kiên Hoàng, Trần Nhượng, Minh Hằng, Trọng Hùng...	Nơi hạnh phúc mỉm cười (Where the Happiness Smiles) by Thùy Chi	Drama, Family	Formerly: Hạnh phúc mỉm cười (When the Happiness Smiles)
8 Dec 2013- 15 Feb 2014	Gái già xì-tin (Cutesy Spinster)	20	VFC	Trần Quang Vinh (director); Nguyễn Thu Thủy, Khánh Hà (writers); Phương Oanh, Chí Nhân, Anh Dũng, Minh Hòa, Trần Đức, Đức Trung, Huyền Thanh, Bình Trọng, Uy Linh, Diễm Hương, Viết Thái...	Sẽ nói yêu anh (Gonna Say Love You) by Nhật Thủy	Romance, Comedy	Adapted from novel of the same name by Nguyễn Thu Thủy. Aired 22:00 to 22:45 in 2014 (Ep 8 to the end).

== VTV6 Weeknight Late-time dramas ==
A new time slot was opened this year. These dramas air from 22:00 to 22:30, Monday to Friday on VTV6.

Broadcast	Title	Eps.	Prod.	Cast and crew	Theme song(s)	Genre	Notes
2 Sep-8 Nov	Cha và con (Father and Daughter)	48; Original: 32	VTV and Kiet Tuong LLC	Lý Khắc Lynh (director); Đặng Triều Thanh, Kiết Tường (adapters); Cao Thùy Dương, Bảo Anh, Trương Nam Thành, Công Danh, Thiên Thủy, Linh Trang, Nguyễn Hữu Hòa, Cao Hoàng, Quách Cung Phong, Kim Ngân, Tiến Đạt, Nguyễn Ngọc Thảo, Phạm Thanh Điền, Anh Thư, Tăng Quỳnh Như, Nguyễn Văn Nghĩa, Minh Hằng, Tiên Châu, Bích Ngọc, Huỳnh Văn Bé, Trịnh Thái Hiệp, Nguyễn Minh Thuận...	Sóng gió cuộc đời (Waves of Life) by Tuấn Khanh Microwave	Crime, Drama, Family	Based on Italian series Linda and The Cop
11 Nov 2013- 21 Feb 2014	Trái tim kiêu hãnh (Proud Heart)	68	VFS	Nguyễn Quốc Tuấn (director); Nguyễn Quốc Tuấn, Quỳnh Trang (writers); Mai Chi, Tiến Lộc, Tuấn Hùng, Bùi Cường, Minh Thảo, Thế Bình, Minh Hằng, Đức Khuê, Vân Navy, Hương Giang, Ngọc Thụy, Khánh Linh, Thúy An, Văn Lượng, Đình Tùng, Hoàng Nam, Quỳnh Anh, Huỳnh Anh, Tú Béo, Huy Cận, Bình Trọng, Hồng Thái, Điền Viên, Huyền Thanh, Hoàng Mai, Minh Thúy, Trần Trung, Thúy Hà, Quốc Thắng, Kinh Quốc, Hồng Thái, Hoàng Nam, Văn Đoàn, Hồng Mỹ, Ngọc Bích, Bá Biên, Mạnh Linh, Xuân Trường, Văn Giáp, Thùy Dương, Phú Đôn, Mạnh Kiên, Văn Bích, Minh Vũ, Quang Hưng, Hồng Hạnh, Thu Hương, Thanh Tú, Thanh Kiều, Như Ý, Cường Việt, Hồng Sơn, Văn Hồng...	Trái tim kiêu hãnh (Proud Heart) by Lưu Hương Giang	Sports, Drama, Romance	Started filming in 2010. Originally 75 eps.

== Special TV Movie ==
The film was a joint effort between Vietnam Television (VTV) and Tokyo Broadcasting System (TBS) to mark 40 years of diplomatic relations between Vietnam and Japan this year.

Broadcast	Title	Eps.	Prod.	Cast and crew	Theme song(s)	Genre	Notes
29 Sep	Người cộng sự (The Partner 〜愛いとしき百年ひゃくねんの友ともへ〜); Za Pātonā ~ itoshiki hyakunen no tomo e ~	1 (120′)	VTV and TBS	Jun Muto (director-in-chief); Phạm Thanh Phong, Ayato Matsuda (directors); Junichiro Taniguchi (writer); Huỳnh Đông, Noriyuki Higashiyama, Emi Takei, Lan Phương, Mana Ashida, Kazue Fukiishi, Bình Minh, Hồng Đăng, Tetsuya Takeda, Akira Emoto, Yuichi Nakamaru (KAT-TUN), Yukiyo Toake...	Giấc mơ còn mãi (The Dream Remains Forever) by Khánh Linh & Nguyễn Ngọc Anh	Biography, Period, Drama	Airs from 20:00 to 22:00 on VTV1. Based on stories of Phan Bội Châu's life and activities in Japan.

== See also ==
- List of dramas broadcast by Vietnam Television (VTV)
- List of dramas broadcast by Hanoi Radio Television (HanoiTV)
- List of dramas broadcast by Vietnam Digital Television (VTC)
