= List of VTV dramas broadcast in 2015 =

This is a list of VTV dramas released in 2015.

←2014 - 2015 - 2016→

== VTV Special Tet dramas ==
Since 2015, VTV only produces one Tet drama.

This drama airs from 20:10 to 20:55, 28th-29th & 1st-2nd Tet holiday on VTV1.

Broadcast	Title	Eps.	Prod.	Cast and crew	Theme song(s)	Genre	Notes
16-20 Feb	Cánh gió đầu xuân (The Wind Vane For Early Spring)	4	VFC	Vũ Hồng Sơn (director); Chu Hồng Vân (writer); Diệp Anh, Khuất Quỳnh Hoa, Huyền Thanh, Ngọc Quỳnh, Hằng Nga, Quang Thắng, Kiên Cường, Hải Yến, Thanh Hiền, Khánh Trang, Thanh Thủy, Trần Đình Cường...	Đón Tết (Welcoming Tet) by Trà My	Family	

== VTV1 Weeknight Prime-time dramas ==
=== Monday-Tuesday dramas ===
These dramas air from 20:40 to 21:30, Monday and Tuesday on VTV1.

Starting in March 2015, the time slot 'Monday to Wednesday' was changed to 'Monday and Tuesday'.

Broadcast	Title	Eps.	Prod.	Cast and crew	Theme song(s)	Genre	Notes
6 Jan-12 May	Sóng ngầm (Groundswell)	33	VTV and Galaxy Studio	Nguyễn Mạnh Hà (director); Thủy Ngân, Thái Ly, Thanh Hồng, Hương Trà (writers); Như Quỳnh, Tiến Đạt, Thanh Quý, Bùi Bài Bình, Vân Anh, Vĩnh Xương, Quế Hằng, Linh Miu, Đỗ Duy Nam, Hồ Liên...	Chuyện đời (Life Story) by Trọng Văn & Hàn Vũ; Chậm lại chút thôi (Slightly Slow Down) by Đỗ Vũ Phương Anh	Drama, Family	First 18 eps air on Mon to Wed
25 May-29 Sep	Hận thù hóa giải (Healing Hatred)	31	Vnmedia	Lê Minh (director); Nguyễn Xuân Đức (writer); Thương Tín, Mỹ Duyên, Dương Cẩm Lynh, Đoàn Thanh Tài, Thanh Duy, Công Hậu, Tấn Hoàng, Cao Hoàng, Quốc Huy, Bảo Ngọc, Hùng Thuận...	'Hận thù hóa giải' theme song Composed by Lê Anh Dũng	Drama, Post-war	
5 Oct-22 Dec	Đối thủ kỳ phùng (Rivals: Tug of War)	40	VTV and VFS	Nguyễn Quang, Nguyễn Thu (directors); Từ Nguyên Trực, Ngọc Lê (writers); Tiến Đạt, Phạm Cường, Đức Khuê, Đức Sơn, Vũ Phan Anh, Minh Hiếu, Phương Oanh, Ngọc Quỳnh, Linh Hương, Việt Thắng, Quốc Thắng, Huy Trinh...	'Đối thủ kỳ phùng' theme song Composed by Vũ Nhật Tân	Crime, Drama	Ep 8 to Ep 38 air on all weeknight (Mon to Fri)

=== Wednesday-Friday dramas ===
These dramas air from 20:40 to 21:30, Wednesday to Friday on VTV1.

Starting in March 2015, the time slot 'Thursday and Friday' was changed to 'Wednesday to Friday'.

Broadcast	Title	Eps.	Prod.	Cast and crew	Theme song(s)	Genre	Notes
28 May-22 Oct	Khi đàn chim trở về 3 (When the Birds Return 3)	46	VFC	Nguyễn Danh Dũng (director); Nguyễn Ngọc Đức (writer); Việt Anh, Kiều Thanh, Tùng Dương, Trần Nhượng, Lê Ngọc Quang, Lâm Vissay, Doãn Quốc Đam, Vân Anh, Thiện Tùng, Lý Thanh Kha...	Bến yên bình (Dock of Peace) by Tùng Dương	Crime, Drama	Khi đàn chim trở về 1, 2, 3 are three independent stories but share same thread of rangers
23 Dec 2015- 23 Mar 2016	Lời ru mùa đông (Winter Lullaby)	31	VFC	Mai Hồng Phong (director); Chu Thu Hằng (writer); Như Quỳnh, Đức Khuê, Thúy Hằng, Minh Tiệp, Minh Hương, Trương Thu Hà, Vũ Phan Anh, Đỗ Quỳnh Hoa, Phương Oanh, Nam Thương, Ba Duy, Thanh Tùng, Thùy Linh, Xuân Hảo, Cường Việt, Minh Thảo, Khắc Trịnh, Văn Minh, Tuyết Liên...	Tìm lại lời ru (Retrieve the Lullaby) by Minh Chuyên; Vấn vương (Linger) by Hà Vy	Family, Drama	

== VTV3 Weeknight Prime-time dramas ==
=== Monday-Tuesday dramas ===
These dramas air from 21:15 to 22:10, Monday and Tuesday on VTV3.

Broadcast	Title	Eps.	Prod.	Cast and crew	Theme song(s)	Genre	Notes
11 Aug-28 Dec	Người đứng trong gió (The Man Who Stands in the Wind)	40	Khang Viet Film	Bùi Nam Yên (director); Trần Quế Ngọc (writer); Đào Bá Sơn, Diễm My, Thân Thúy Hà, Mạnh Trường, Hà Việt Dũng, Linh Sơn, Quang Hòa, Nhã Phương, Xuân Văn, Minh Thảo, Kiến An, Kim Huyền, Thiên Kim...	Người đứng trong gió (The Man Who Stands in the Wind) by Thanh Nguyên & Duy Linh	Drama	
29 Dec 2015- 7 June 2016	Nữ cảnh sát tập sự (Probationary Policewoman)	45	Sóng Vàng (Golden Screen Prod.) (later renamed MegaGS)	Nguyễn Phương Điền (director); Đặng Thu Trang (writer); Minh Thảo, Lương Thế Thành, Huy Khánh, Minh Cường, Quốc Trường, Lê Hoàng, Hồ Giang Bảo Sơn, Long Đẹp Trai, Trung Dũng, Ái Châu, Hữu Châu, Phi Điểu, Hoài An, Quốc Hùng, Lê Thiện, Bích Trâm...	Ước mơ bình yên (Wishing Peace) & Tình mãi là tia nắng (Love is Light of Sun) by Tuyết Mai	Crime, Drama, Romance	Produced in 2012.

=== Wednesday–Thursday dramas ===
These dramas air from 21:15 to 22:10, Wednesday and Thursday on VTV3.

Broadcast	Title	Eps.	Prod.	Cast and crew	Theme song(s)	Genre	Notes
29 Apr-6 Aug	Hôn nhân trong ngõ hẹp (Marriage in the Narrow Alley)	30	VFC	Vũ Trường Khoa (director); Tăng Quách Quỳnh Lam (writer); Trung Anh, Thanh Quý, Chí Nhân, Minh Hà, Mạnh Hưng, Khuất Quỳnh Hoa, Trọng Nhân, Kiều My, Diễm Hương, Đặng Loan, Gia Bảo...	Trở về bên nhau (Back Together) by Dương Hoàng Yến	Marriage, Family, Drama	Formerly: Sau 7 năm hạnh phúc (After 7 Years of Happiness)
12 Aug-19 Nov	Cảnh sát hình sự: Câu hỏi số 5 (Criminal Police: Question Number 5)	30	VFC	Bùi Quốc Việt (director); Trung Dũng, Khánh Bùi (writers); Tiến Lộc, Bảo Anh, Đỗ Kỷ, Hoàng Tùng, Kiều Thanh, Thanh Hoa, Chí Nhân, Doãn Quốc Đam, Minh Thảo, Ngọc Dương, Thanh Huyền, Nguyễn Lộc, Vũ Hải, Tiến Đại...	Nỗi đau không tên (Nameless Pain) by Trà My; Đến nơi bình yên (To a Quiet Place) by Lưu Hương Giang	Crime, Drama, Thriller	
25 Nov 2015- 18 Feb 2016; Re-release: 30 Mar-18 May 2023 (VTV1)	Khúc hát mặt trời (A Song to the Sun)	24 (45′); Re-rls: 34 (30′)	VFC and TBS	Vũ Trường Khoa (director); Đàm Vân Anh, Hoàng Hồng Hạnh, Đỗ Thủy Tiên (writers); Nhã Phương, Quang Tuấn, Đồng Thu Hà, Trọng Trinh, Huỳnh Anh, Hoàng Oanh, Đinh Hương, Việt Anh, Xuân Nghị, Ngân Quỳnh...	Khúc hát mặt trời 1 Khúc hát mặt trời 2 (A Song to the Sun 1 & 2); Đêm (Night); Loving You by Thùy Chi; Em về tinh khôi (Pristine) by Thùy Chi & Hoàng Anh	Drama, Romance	Based on Japanese movie & drama A Song to the Sun (TBS 2006). Filming in Vietnam & Japan.

== VTV3 Rubic 8 dramas ==
These dramas air from 14:20 to 15:10, Saturday and Sunday on VTV3 as a part of the program Rubic 8.

Broadcast	Title	Eps.	Prod.	Cast and crew	Theme song(s)	Genre	Notes
10 Jan-15 Feb	Màu của tình yêu (The Color of Love)	12	VFC	Mai Hồng Phong (director); Chi Hoa, Tô Dũng, Hoàng Thu Trang, Tôn Thất Chương, Diễm Lộc, Mai Ngọc Căn, Khuất Quỳnh Hoa, Trịnh Xuân Hào, Đào Hoàng Yến, Hoàng Huy, Kiều Trang, Thu An, Thu Chanh, Anh Nguyệt, Sùng Lãm, Thanh Nhàn, Sỹ Lai...	Vệt nắng mùa đông (Winter Sunlight) by Thu Trang	Drama, Romance	
21 Feb-29 Mar	Viết tiếp bản tình ca (On and On the Love Song)	12	VFC	Vũ Minh Trí (director); Nguyễn Thị Vân Anh (writer); Thùy Linh, Lưu Đê Ly, Thanh Sơn, Anh Dũng, Lan Hương 'Bông', Quốc Trị, Trung Anh, Quế Hằng, Ngọc Thoa, Quang Minh...	Bản tình ca trong mơ (Dreamy Love Song); Opening version by Vương Duy; Ending version by Hà My	Romance, Drama	
4 Apr-14 Jun	Máy bay ký sự (Flight Diary)	22	VFC	Trịnh Lê Phong (director); Hà Anh Thu, Tống Phương Dung (writers); Vân Anh, Đình Tú, Kim Oanh, Thùy Dương, Thanh Sơn, Nguyễn Thị Loan, Gia Linh, Minh Hằng, Trung Anh, Nguyễn Tiến Huy, Viết Thái, Tiến Lộc, Nguyễn Kiều Trang, Linh Sugar...	Một trái tim rất yêu (A Heart Full of Love) by Phạm Cẩm Vân	Romance, Drama	
20 Jun-11 Oct	Khép mắt chờ ngày mai (Close Eyes 'Til Tomorrow)	34	VFC	Vũ Trường Khoa (director); Thu Dung (writer); Hạnh Sino, Ngô Thế Nguyên, Quang Minh, Doãn Quốc Đam, Như Quỳnh, Ngọc Tản, Nguyễn Mạnh Cường, Sỹ Tiến, Thanh Tú, Khuất Quỳnh Hoa, Ngọc Hoàng Anh...	Giấc mơ của con (My Dream) by Thùy Chi	Drama	Formerly: Dương cầm xanh (Blue Piano)
17 Oct-27 Dec	Bạch mã hoàng tử (Prince Charming)	22	VFC	Vũ Minh Trí (director); Trịnh Cẩm Hằng, Thuận Nguyễn, Nguyễn Trang (writers); Bùi Hà Anh, Phạm Anh Tuấn, Đỗ Hà Anh, Nguyễn Minh Trang, Trung Anh, Công Lý, Trịnh Huyền, Hoàng Xuân, Trần Trung, Doãn Quốc Đam...	Giấc mơ nhẹ nhàng (Delicate Dream) by Minh Vương & Thùy Chi	Drama, Romance, Youth	Adapted from the novel of the same name by Hồng Sakura

== Non-recurring dramas ==
This drama was released in the time slot that's originally made for playback dramas. It airs from 08:45 to 09:30, Monday to Friday on VTV6

Broadcast	Title	Eps.	Prod.	Cast and crew	Theme song(s)	Genre	Notes
22 Apr-29 May	Những cánh hoa trước gió (Petals Against the Wind)	24	VFC	Đỗ Chí Hướng (director); Thu Thủy (writer); Lệ Quyên, Lê Trang, Bạch Quỳnh, Lan Anh, Xuân Phúc, Quang Minh, Ngọc Quỳnh, Thanh Hương, Hồng Quang, Thái Hòa, Thu Huyền, Thanh Nhàn, Huy Bách, Kim Ngọc, Thùy Liên, Huyền Trang, Đỗ Kỷ, Kim Xuyến, Nguyễn Thu Hà, Hoàng Công, Mạnh Hưng, Diễm My, Tiến Đạt, Mai Duyên, Trang Dung, Xuân Trình...	'Những cánh hoa trước gió' theme song by Thùy Chi	Drama	Adapted from the novel of 'Như lục bình trôi' by Khúc Thụy Du. Preceded by Khi người đàn ông góa vợ bật khóc (2013). Followed by Chạm tay vào nỗi nhớ (2013).

== See also ==
- List of dramas broadcast by Vietnam Television (VTV)
- List of dramas broadcast by Hanoi Radio Television (HanoiTV)
- List of dramas broadcast by Vietnam Digital Television (VTC)
