= List of VTV dramas broadcast in 2025 =

This is a list of VTV dramas released in 2025.

←2024 – 2025 – 2026→

== VTV Special Tet dramas ==
This drama airs from 12:00 to 12:50, 1st to 5th lunar-new-year days on VTV5 - the channel for ethnic minorities. It is produced by the Ethnic Language Television Department of Vietnam Television (VTV).

Broadcast	Title	Eps.	Prod.	Cast and crew	Theme song(s)	Genre	Notes
29 Jan–2 Feb	Hẹn ước ngày xuân (Spring Day Promise)	5	VTV	Nguyễn Love (director); Nguyệt Anh (writer); Lê Hồng Linh (editor); Cù Thị Trà, Thuận Nguyễn, Quốc Anh, Ngọc Thư, Minh Tuấn, Tiến Nguyễn, Phạm Tất Thành, Xoăn Bùi, Lại Thanh Hà, A Tủa, Phạm Ngọc Thân, Mạnh Hùng, YanMy...	Trái tim của núi (Heart of the Mountain) by Thảo Phương	Romance, Ethnic, Political, Slice-of-Life, Drama	

== VTV1 Weeknight Prime-time dramas ==
These dramas air from 21:00 to 21:30, Monday to Friday on VTV1.

Broadcast	Title	Eps.	Prod.	Cast and crew	Theme song(s)	Genre	Notes
17 Mar–30 May	Mẹ biển (Mother Ocean)	50; Pt.1: 18e Pt.2: 32e	VFC	Nguyễn Phương Điền (director); Kim Li Bắc, Ngọc Bích (writers); Hoàng Hồng Hạnh (editor); Kim Tuyến, Cao Minh Đạt, Trương Minh Quốc Thái, Cao Thái Hà, Minh Dự, Quyên Qui, Hữu Khang/Minh Đăng, Trúc Mây/Suri Nhã Vy, Quang Thái/Đức Duy, Huy Khang/Thanh Thức, Huỳnh Thiên Thọ, Phúc An, Hương Giang, Lily Chen, Trương Lộc, Đình Hiếu, Đào Anh Tuấn, Việt Anh, Huy Cường, Hiếu Hiền, Kiến An, Thanh Hiền, Nam Anh, Huỳnh An, Trần Trung Tín, Phạm Hùng, Lê Thanh Phúc, Hoàng Tâm...	Bão lòng (Storm Hearts) by Khánh Đơn & Nhật Kim Anh Mẹ biển (Mother Ocean) by Alex Vũ & Lily Chen	Romance, Slice-of-Life, Family, Drama	Delayed 5 eps on 28–30 Apr, 15 & 19 May.
2 Jun–28 Jul	Dịu dàng màu nắng (Gentle Sunshine)	40 (30′); Replay: 25 (45')	VFC	Bùi Quốc Việt (director); Thu Trang, Tuấn Dương, Mai Diệp, Hà Thu Hà (writers); Trịnh Khánh Hà (editor); Duy Hưng, Lương Thu Trang, Nguyễn Ngọc Huyền, B Trần, Lan Hương 'Bông', Nguyệt Hằng, Cù Thị Trà, Nguyễn Thị Mai Huê, Lưu Duy Khánh, Thái Dương, Đỗ Kỷ, Bùi Minh Phương, Bình An, Thanh Hoa, Xuân Hồng, Minh Cúc, Đặng Minh Thông, Tuyết Trinh, Lê Khôi Nguyên, Phương Hạnh, Hà Bích Ngọc, Hoàng Huy, Hồng Nhung, Lê Linh Hương, Bích Thủy... Cameo: Trọng Nghĩa, Hoàng Vũ, Nguyễn Thùy Dương	Chẳng thể biết sau này (Unknown Later) by Nguyễn Minh Phúc & h0n Kết thúc bắt đầu (End Begin) by Da LAB	Drama, Comedy, Family, Business, Romance	Delayed 1 ep on 20 Jun.
29 Jul–24 Oct	Có anh, nơi ấy bình yên (With You, There is Peace)	51	VFC	Nguyễn Danh Dũng (director); Nguyễn Mạnh Cường, Lê Anh Thúy, Hoàng Hồng Hạnh (writers); Đặng Diệu Hương (editor); Tuấn Tú, Vĩnh Xương, Nguyễn Thanh Bình, Bá Anh, Bùi Bài Bình, Thái Sơn, Thanh Quý, Thu Quỳnh, Hoàng Công, Sùng Lãm, Lê Hoàng Long, Trần Gia Huy, Diệu Linh, Lê Xuân Anh, Vân Dung, Nguyễn Thanh Tú, Phú Đôn, Lưu Huyền Trang, Ngọc Thư, Minh Tuấn, Việt Bắc, Chu Mạnh Cường, Quang Lâm, Bình Xuyên, Đào Hoàng Yến, Phạm Tuấn Anh, Trần Trung Kiên, Thu Hương, Thiên Kiều, Danh Thái, Trịnh Huyền, Hoàng Huy, Hương Thùy, Phan Thắng, Thân Hoài Thương, Hoàng Khải, Lã Tất Đông, Nguyễn Oanh, Phùng Khánh Linh, Trung Đức, Trịnh Minh Phú, Tiến Huy, Hải Vy, Đào Phương Anh, Ngô Bình, Phan Thương, Lê Như Nguyên Thành, Alex Long, Bích Lan...	Anh Công an xã mình (My Commune Police); Lê Minh Sơn & Quỳnh Thi	Drama, Crime, Political, Comedy, Rural	Delayed 13 eps on 6 & 13 Aug, 15 & 22 Aug; 1 & 2 Sep, 5 & 9 Sep, 15 & 18 Sep, 14 & 15 Oct and 22 Oct. Celebrating the 80th anniversary of People's Public Security of Vietnam. Formerly: Gió đổi chiều (Wind Change Direction)
28 Oct 2025–30 Jan 2026	Lằn ranh (The Line)	58	VFC	Nguyễn Mai Hiền (director); Phan Ngọc Tiến, Nguyễn Trung Dũng (writers); Vũ Liêm (editor); Trọng Trinh, Trung Anh, Phạm Cường, Mạnh Trường, Hồng Diễm, Tiến Lộc, Huyền Trang, Nguyễn Mạnh Cường, Quỳnh Nga, Phú Kiên, Dương Đức Quang, Phú Thăng, Đặng Tất Bình, Nguyệt Hằng, Thanh Quý, Ngọc Thư, Thuý Hà, Hà Việt Dũng, Doãn Quốc Đam, Duy Hưng, Bảo Anh, Anh Đào, Huyền Sâm, Dương Anh Đức, Uy Linh, Lâm Tùng, Thanh Tùng, Phùng Đức Hiếu, Lại Thanh Hà, Nguyễn Tú, Dương Khánh, Nguyễn Kim Oanh, Thanh Huế, Tuấn Cường, Nông Dũng Nam, Vương Trọng Trí, Nguyễn Thanh Tú, Xuân Thông, Hà Bích Ngọc, Nhật Quang, Trần Đức Sơn, Tuấn Thanh, Nam Việt...		Crime, Drama, Political, Legal	Delayed 11 eps on 30 Oct, 3 & 6 Nov, 5 Dec 2025, 1, 19–23 & 28 Jan 2026 due 14th National Congress of the Communist Party of Vietnam. Ordered by Supreme People's Procuracy of Vietnam.

== VTV3 Weeknight Prime-time dramas ==
=== First line-up ===
The following drama airs from 20:00 to 20:30, Monday to Friday on VTV3. This time slot has been discontinued.

Broadcast	Title	Eps.	Prod.	Cast and crew	Theme song(s)	Genre	Notes
6 Jan–14 Feb	Đi về miền có nắng (Go Where the Sun Shines)	25	SK Pictures	Quốc Thuận (director); Hiểu Anh, Thanh Tú (writers); SK Pictures (editor); Bình An, Hoàng Khánh Ly, Yên Đan, Đức Sơn, Lam Tuyền, Hồ Hồng Thắm, Gia Tường, Trung Tuấn, Bảo Tâm, Bảo Trung, Dương Lam Anh, Phương Đại, Thân Ngọc, Thành Tá, Di Di... / Trung Anh, Thảo Trâm, Ngọc Báu; Cameo: Bùi Phương Nga	Nắng và gió (Sun and Wind) by Dương Khắc Linh & Hoàng Huy Long, Sara Lưu	Romance, Slice-of-Life, Drama	Delayed 5 eps on 27-31 Jan due to Tet holiday. Formerly: Cùng em đón bình minh (Welcome the Dawn with You)

=== Second line-up ===
==== Monday-Wednesday dramas ====
Starting from February 17, VTV opens a new prime time slot for Vietnamese TV dramas on VTV3 from 20:00 to 20:50.

These dramas air from 20:00 to 20:50, Monday to Wednesday on VTV3.

Broadcast	Title	Eps.	Prod.	Cast and crew	Theme song(s)	Genre	Notes
17 Feb–28 May	Cha tôi, người ở lại (My Father Who Stayed)	45	VFC	Vũ Trường Khoa (director); Thảo Đan, An Nguyên, Trần Thu (writers); Trịnh Cẩm Hằng, Trịnh Đan Phượng (editors); Bùi Như Lai, Thái Sơn, Nguyễn Hoàng Ngọc Huyền, Trần Nghĩa, Vũ Hồng Thái, Kiều Anh, Thu Quỳnh, Trần Trung Kiên, Minh Tiệp, Lương Thu Trang, Nguyễn Châu/Thanh Huế, Công Lý, Thu Hương, Hà Trung, Uy Linh, Thùy Liên, Lưu Huyền Trang, Việt Pháp, Vũ Tuấn Việt, Nguyễn Thùy Dương, Phạm Hồng, Đức Hùng, Nguyễn Hà, Lê Hà, Bảo An, Đăng Anh, Ali Quang Khải, Hồng Ngọc, Hoa Thúy, Hà Lê, Nguyễn Quỳnh Trang, Đàm Khánh Linh, Vương Trọng Trí, Nguyễn Tiến Lộc, Hương Linh, Linh Kool, Lan Anh... / Trần Bảo Nam, Phương Linh, Nhật Minh... Cameo: Đình Tú	Đi một đường, về hai hướng (One Way Go, Two Ways Back) & Tìm về (Find the Way back) & Hoa dại khờ (Foolish Flowers) by Hương Ly & Tiến Minh	Romance, Family, Drama, Youth	Based on Chinese drama Go Ahead (HunanTV 2020). Formerly: Lấy danh nghĩa người nhà (In the Name of Family)
2 Jun–6 Aug	Mặt trời lạnh (Cold Sun)	30	VFC	Lê Hùng Phương (director); Nguyễn Thị Như Khanh (writer); Lê Thu Thủy (editor); Trương Minh Thảo, Lê Khánh Linh, Tú Vi, Vũ Tuấn Việt, Minh Đức, Quốc Cường, Thân Thúy Hà, Mai Thu Huyền, Trí Quang, Nguyễn Anh Tú, Ricky Star, Thiên Vương, Lê Văn Anh, Linh Trung, Hải Sơn, Hà Kim, Dũng Hà, Lương Thị Thanh Hoa, Lưu Phát, Phương Nguyễn, Tuyết Nương, Đặng Trần Thiên Tứ, Bảo Trung, Minh Hoàng, Hiền Ngô, Hoàng Như Mỹ, Nguyễn Sơn, Minh Tùng, Phan Minh Trí, Hoài Anh, Trần Trọng Hiếu, Khương Hưng, Kim Đào, Ngô Hoàng, Thành Nhân, Thái Châu, Nguyễn Ngọc Hà My, Bùi Minh Đức, Bùi Xuân Thắng, Nguyễn Trí Ngân, Đinh Hữu Thượng, Diệp Phi Phụng, Trần Quốc Trạng, Tuyết Dung, Lê Hùng Phương, Anh Đức, Lê Triệu Vy... / Cao Thùy Linh, Nguyễn Phương Linh, Thiện Toàn, Zoe Như Quỳnh, Thanh Tùng, Nguyễn Vũ Uy Nhân; Cameo: Hữu Châu, Hương Giang, PJPO, Freaky, Đạt Nhỏ	Phố mùa đông (Winter Street) by Bảo Chấn Ngày không tên (Namless Day) by Việt Anh Cô gái hạnh phúc (Happy Girls) by Ricky Star & PJPO, Freaky, Đạt Nhỏ	Drama, Romance, Crime, Slice-of-Life	
11 Aug–26 Nov	Gió ngang khoảng trời xanh (Wind Across the Blue Sky)	48	VFC	Lê Đỗ Ngọc Linh (director); Lê Anh Thúy, Lại Phương Thảo, Đặng Thiếu Ngân (writers); Đàm Vân Anh (editor); Phương Oanh, Doãn Quốc Đam, Quỳnh Kool, Tô Dũng, Việt Hoa, Bùi Gia Nghĩa, Lan Phương, Đức Khuê, Tú Oanh, Huyền Trang, Khánh Huyền, Bích Diệp, Thùy Liên, Denis Đặng, Phùng Đức Hiếu, Hoàng Sơn, Lê Hà, Đào Trúc Mai, Hoàng Triều Dương, Hà Thành, Đào Nguyễn Ánh, Ngô Quân Anh, Trung Anh, Minh Cúc, Hồ Liên, Hoàng Phương Thảo, Thục Anh, Lý Chí Huy, Quỳnh Anh, Trần Thu, Sơn Lâm, Diệu Linh, Đặng Xuân Đồng, Lâm Đức Anh, Quang Minh, Vương Trọng Trí, Thân Hoài Thương, Lê Nguyễn Hà Anh... / Huyền Anh, Khánh An, Đỗ Thu Yến, Văn Hà, Lương Ngọc Dung, Khôi Nguyên, Nhật Minh; Cameo: Nguyễn Thị Mai Huê	Khép lại dở dang (Close Unfinished) by Hồ Hoài Anh & Ngọc Anh Để lại đằng sau (Leave it Behind) by Zen & Hoàng Mai	Drama, Romance, Office, Comedy	Based on Chinese drama Nothing But Thirty (WeTV 2020). Formerly: Ngày mai cho em (Tomorrow For You)
1 Dec 2025–11 Feb 2026	Gia đình trái dấu (Family Opposite)	33	VFC	Vũ Trường Khoa (director); Trần Diệu Linh, Nguyễn Quang Hồng Nhật (writers); Lại Phương Thảo (editor); Hoàng Hải, Kiều Anh, Thừa Tuấn Anh, Nguyễn Quỳnh Trang, Nguyễn Ngọc An Nhiên, Vũ Hồng Thái, Nguyễn Thùy Dương, Phùng Tiến Minh, Quốc Trị, Việt Bắc, Nguyễn Thu Hường, Nguyễn Thanh Tú, Mạnh Hưng, Lâm Đức Anh, Hoàng Thu Trang, Hoàng Mai Anh, Đàm Hằng, Hoàng Sơn, Tuấn Thành, Ngọc Linh, Trần Quốc Việt, Triệu Huyền Thu, Lê Hà... Cameo: Thái Sơn	Ngược chiều để yêu (Love in Reverse) by Phùng Tiến Minh & Hương Ly	Drama, Comedy, Political, Family, Marriage, Romance	Airing from 20:00 to 20:55, epi 20-33.

==== Thursday-Friday dramas ====
These dramas air from 20:00 to 20:50, Thursday and Friday on VTV3.

Broadcast	Title	Eps.	Prod.	Cast and crew	Theme song(s)	Genre	Notes
20 Feb–30 May	Những chặng đường bụi bặm (Dusty Roads)	30	VFC	Trịnh Lê Phong (director); Hồng Tươi, Thủy Vũ, Minh Ngọc (writers); Nguyễn Thu Thủy (editor); Võ Hoài Nam, Đình Tú, Quỳnh Châu, Nguyễn Thanh Bình, Đức Phong, Linh Huệ, Phú Đôn, Văn Báu, Đới Anh Quân, Tuyết Liên, Thùy Liên, Ngọc Tản, Quỳnh Dương, Thanh Tùng, Tô Dũng, Bảo Hân, Lâm Đức Anh, Đào Phương Anh, Đức Sơn, Kim Ngân, Vương Trọng Trí, Hoàng Quân, Tiến Huy, Thái An, Quang Lâm, An Ninh, Thiên Kiều, Lã Tất Đông, Tạ Vũ Thu, Lê Tuấn Thành, Hà Lê, Hoàng Huy, Tiến Anh Tuấn, Hùng Dũng, Hiểu Minh, Gia Long, Bùi Vũ Phong, Nguyễn Linh Nhi, Thục Trang... / Tuấn Vũ, Chí Bách	Đến cùng tận (To the Very End) by Hà Anh Tuấn	Adventure, Slice-of-Life, Drama, Crime	
5 Jun–29 Aug	Cầu vồng ở phía chân trời (Rainbow on the Horizon)	26	VFC	Vũ Minh Trí (director); Trần Diệu Linh (writer); Lại Phương Thảo (editor); Trọng Lân, Anh Đào, Nguyễn Thanh Bình, Tú Oanh, Linh Huệ, Phùng Khánh Linh, Bùi Gia Nghĩa, Nguyễn Ngọc An Nhiên, Lê Linh Hương, Phương Lâm, Anh Tuấn, Nguyễn Minh Phương, Nguyễn Long Vũ, Nguyễn Bích Thủy, Nguyễn Minh, Bùi Quỳnh Như, Phạm Hồng, Phạm Trình, Quang Sơn, Thanh Tùng, Alex Long...	Cầu vồng yêu thương (Rainbow of Love) by Trần Quang Duy & Minh Vương	Drama, Romance, Comedy, Family	
4 Sep 2025–23 Jan 2026	Cách em 1 milimet (1–Millimeter Away)	42; Pt.1: 11e Pt.2: 31e	VFC	Phạm Gia Phương, Trần Trọng Khôi (directors); Minh Ngọc, Thủy Vũ (writers); Nguyễn Thu Thủy (editor); Ali Thục Phương/Quỳnh Châu, Nguyễn Sơn Tùng/Hà Việt Dũng, Nguyễn Quỳnh Trang/Phan Minh Huyền, Chí Nhân, Gia Long/Huỳnh Anh, Nhật Minh/Trọng Lân, Khánh Chi/Kiều My, Bùi Nguyễn Gia Bảo/Lưu Mạnh Dũng, Đức Phong/Lê Hoàng Long, Hùng Dũng/Trương Hoàng, Tân Anh, Hiểu Minh, Anh Minh, Thái Khang, Lưu Hiểu Vân/Thùy Dương, Nguyễn Minh Tâm, Vũ Mai Huê, Bích Thủy, Hồ Phong, Tuấn Cường, Đức Minsu/Thái Hòa, Quỳnh Dương, Bảo Anh, Bùi Thị Ngọc Trâm, Đức Châu, Ngô Minh Hoàng, Lê Thanh Hải, Trương Thảo My, Tùng Anh, Hoàng Diệp, Khôi Nguyên, Trường Sơn, Bùi Trần Nhật Hà, Việt Thắng, Trịnh Khôi Nguyên, Trần Quốc Trọng, Xuân Trường, Hoa Thúy, Nông Dũng Nam, Trịnh Huyền, Đới Anh Quân, Thu Quế, Đàm Phương Linh, Nguyễn Đức Phong Thiên, An An, Đại Lâm, Mỹ Phương, Nguyễn Ngọc Thủy, Tùng Anh, Huỳnh Đức, Thương Thánh Thiện, Sông Thương, Đinh Thị Loan, Tạ Vũ Thu, Phạm Kiều Ánh...	Sắc màu tuổi thơ (Colors of Childhood) by Nhóm Sắc Màu Thương em (Love You) by Anh Vũ Cách em 1 milimet (1–Millimeter Away) by Mủn Gỗ	Drama, Comedy, Romance, Office, Crime, Childhood	This is VFC final multi-episode television series before airing as a miniseries in this prime time slot. Airing from 20:00 to 20:55, episodes 39-42.

== VTV3 - Weekend Drama Series ==
From November 8, 2025, VTV3 will broadcast feature films in prime time on weekends.

These dramas air from 21:30 to 23:10 (2 episodes), Saturday on VTV3.

Broadcast	Title	Eps.	Prod.	Cast and crew	Theme song(s)	Genre	Notes
8 Nov 2025–7 Feb 2026	Yêu trước ngày cưới (Love Before Marriage)	28; Original: 29	VieON	Võ Thạch Thảo (director); Sỹ Hữu Vinh, Huỳnh Anh Thư, Huỳnh Thương (writers); Song Luân, Minh Trang, Nhã Phương, Quốc Anh, Sĩ Thanh, Hữu Vi, Bi Max, Khánh Linh, Lê Khánh, Cao Thái Hà, Mỹ Duyên, Trịnh Thảo, Đỗ Kỷ, Hoàng Trinh, Huỳnh Anh Tuấn, Xuân Trường, Hữu Thạch, Thụy Mười, Xuân Phúc, Hoàng Sơn Soho, Trần Thiên Tú, Tuấn Khải, Bửu Đa, Võ Lan Hương, Otis, Quỳnh Lương, Ngọc Tưởng, Oanh Kiều, Đức Linh, Thu Trang, Bảo Ngọc, Trâm Anh...	Để trái tim cất lời (To Let the Heart Speak) & Em trong thế giới của anh (You in My World) by Anh Bùi & Kim Jiwon, Orange Mất nhau (Loss) by Hải Âu & Anh Tú Thư cho anh (Letters for Him) by Nhạc của Trang	Drama, Romance	Based on Taiwanese drama Before We Get Married (GTV 2019). The drama was released on VieON in late 2023 - early 2024.

== Non-recurring dramas ==
The drama was released outside of the regular drama time slot. It airs from 10:30 (later 9:45) to 11:15, daily on VTV5.

Broadcast	Title	Eps.	Prod.	Cast and crew	Theme song(s)	Genre	Notes
20–31 Oct	Lý Công Uẩn: Đường tới thành Thăng Long (Lý Công Uẩn: The Road to Thăng Long)	19	Trường Thành Media Co.	Jin Demao, Tạ Huy Cường (directors); Trịnh Văn Sơn, Ke Zhanghe (writers); Tiến Lộc, Thụy Vân, Hoàng Hải, Phan Hòa, Trung Hiếu, Mạnh Quân, Thiện Tùng, Văn Bích, Ngô Hồng Thái, Phạm Anh Dũng, Đỗ Nhật Nam, Đức Sơn, Nông Dũng Nam, Nguyễn Hoàng Nam, Mai Ngọc Căn, Anh Thái, Văn Báu, Phan Cẩm Thượng, Xuân Trường, Kim Hoàn, Khôi Nguyên, Phát Triệu, Ngô Huy Hoàng, Trần Chí Trung, Đỗ Thị Cử, Thái Duy, Xuân Khôi, Văn Học, Sĩ Hoài, Thanh Tùng, Trần Quốc Tuấn, Trung Sơn, Huy Trinh, Huy Cường, Ngọc Quỳnh.../ Lưu Thành Đạt, Phùng Hoa Hoài Linh	Hào khí ngàn năm (Thousand Years Magnanimity) by Quang Hào	Biography, Historical, Drama	Produced in 2009 but cancelled. Aired 2 episodes every day starting 25 Oct (ep 6, 7).

== See also ==
- List of dramas broadcast by Vietnam Television (VTV)
- List of dramas broadcast by Hanoi Radio Television (HanoiTV)
- List of dramas broadcast by Vietnam Digital Television (VTC)
