= List of VTV dramas broadcast in 2026 =

This is a list of VTV dramas released in 2026.

←2025 – 2026 – 2027→

== VTV1 Weeknight Prime-time dramas ==
These dramas air from 21:00 to 21:30, Monday to Friday on VTV1.

| Broadcast | Title | Eps. | Prod. | Cast and crew | Theme song(s) | Genre | Notes |
|---|---|---|---|---|---|---|---|
| 2 Feb–31 Mar | Không giới hạn (No Limits) | 35 | VFC | Nguyễn Đức Hiếu (director); Trịnh Cẩm Hằng, Trịnh Đan Phượng, Phạm Ngọc Hà Lê, Trịnh Khánh Hà (writers); Steven Nguyễn, Nguyễn Minh Trang, Tô Dũng, Anh Đào, Thanh Quý, Quỳnh Dương, Thùy Anh, Maya, Vương Trọng Trí, Minh Cúc, Lâm Đức Anh, Linh Huệ, Quốc Trị, Dương Đức Quang, Việt Thắng, Sùng Lãm, Trần Anh Tuấn, Lại Thanh Hà, Hà Thành, Trang Emma, Lưu Huyền Trang, Lê Hà, Hoàng Tùng, Đinh Thu Hiền, Nguyễn Tuấn, Phạm Minh Quang, Đào Nguyễn Ánh, Bình Nguyên Koka, Khánh An, Hà Lê, Tuyết Trương, Trương Thu Hà, Bích Thủy, Phạm Đình Hưng, Hoàng Phúc Anh, Trần Sinh... Cameo: Đỗ Nhật Hoàng | | Crime, Drama, Political, Army | Supported by General Staff of the Vietnam People's Army and Department of Search and Rescue, Vietnam People's Army Delayed 7 eps due to Tet holiday on 16-20 Feb and due to special events on 23 & 27 Mar. |
| 1 Apr–26 May | Ngược đường ngược nắng (Against the Road, Against the Sun) | 35 | VFC | Vũ Minh Trí (director); Nguyễn Mạnh Cường, Thu Thủy (writers); Lê Anh Thúy, Hoàng Hồng Hạnh (editors); Thanh Quý, Nguyễn Thanh Bình, Tú Oanh, Anh Tuấn, Nguyệt Hằng, Đình Tú, Nguyễn Hoàng Ngọc Huyền, Minh Thu, Dương Anh Đức, Trương Hoàng, Hàn Trang, Hoàng Huy, Tùng Anh, Thục Anh, Trần Ngọc Trâm, Lê Thị Thêm, Nguyễn Ngọc Dung, Duy Khoát, Lê Tuấn Thành, Phú Thăng, Bình Nguyên Koka... | Gửi ngàn dấu yêu (Sending A Thousand Loving Wishes) by Trần Quang Duy & Minh Vương M4U Về đây (Come Here) by Trần Quang Duy & Phương Anh Chu | Drama, Family, Comedy, Rural | Delayed 5 eps on 28-30 Apr and 8 & 18 May. |
| 27 May–3 Jul | Phía bên kia thành phố (In the Other Side of the City) | 26 | VFC | Vũ Trường Khoa, Đào Duy Phúc (directors); Thảo Đan, An Nguyên (writers); Trịnh Đan Phượng, Trịnh Cẩm Hằng (editors); Huyền Sâm, Phùng Khánh Linh, Vũ Hồng Thái, Võ Hoài Vũ, Tú Quyên, Thùy Dương, Ali Thục Phương, Phú Đôn, Uy Linh, Minh Tiệp, Thế Nguyên, Lê Như Nguyên Thành, Hà Linh, Nguyễn Châu, Hà My, Lê Đức Quân, Trung Anh, Đăng Minh, Vũ Thành Đạt, Thanh Huyền, Nguyễn Thái Huy, Phan Trọng Nghĩa, Lê Hà, Nhỏ Duyên, Quốc Quỳnh Liên, Thái Phạm... / Trần Bảo Nam, Đăng Anh | Phố (Street) by Phùng Tiến Minh & Khánh Linh, Minh Tiến Phía bên kia thành phố (In the Other Side of the City) by Phùng Tiến Minh & Minh Hiếu, Ái Hương | Drama, Comedy, Family, Romance, Scholastic | Delayed 2 eps on 29 May and 5 Jun. |
| 6 Jul–17 Aug | Trời cao nguyên xanh (Blue Highland Sky) | 27 | VFC | Nguyễn Mai Hiền (director); Tạ Hồng Minh, Lê Anh Thúy, Vũ Liêm, Ngô Hiền (writers); Nguyễn Trung Dũng, Đặng Diệu Hương (editors); Hà Việt Dũng, Xuân Phúc, Hoàng Hải, Phạm Ngọc Anh, Hoàng Nhân, Luân Nguyễn, Nguyễn Hoàng Thúy Nga, Trần Thế Mạnh, Nguyễn Trọng Hải, Phú Kiên, Bùi Xuân Thảo, Doãn Quốc Đam, Lại Thanh Hà, Ngô Minh Hoàng, Nguyễn Thanh Tuấn, Sùng Lãm, Khôi Trần, Huyền Trang, Đình Hiếu, Nguyễn Mạnh Hùng, Hoàng Nguyên Ngân Thảo, Phạm Đình Hưng, Mai Quỳnh Trang, Nguyễn Quỳnh, Lê Quang Vinh, Xuân Nam, Phạm Tất Thành, Xuân Thắng, Tấn Khoa, Ngô Công Lý, Ngọc Lý, Nguyễn Tân, Ngân Phụng, Thái Sơn, Công Võ, Đinh Văn Anging, Huỳnh Ngọc An, Hùng Cường, Hồ Tấn Trung, Tống Thiên Trung, Đỗ Hiệp, Châu Thế Tâm, Hiếp Nguyễn, Lê Nhớ, Phi Vũ, Cao Hoàng, Khánh Đan, Tuyết Nhung, Đào Cát Bảo Ngọc, Phú Trương, Lý Minh Phụng, Nguyên Thái Lâm, Nguyễn Cao Đức Trí, Trần Cẩm Tú, Nguyễn Thái Bình, Nguyễn Chí Thanh, Nguyên Đức Tâm, Trần Đình Nghĩa, Huy Hoàng, Diễm My... Cameo: Trung Anh, Xuân Trường, Trúc Mây | | Crime, Drama, Political, Security, Ethnic, Action | Celebrating the 80th anniversary of the Traditional Day of the People's Security Force. Delayed 4 eps on 17 & 23 Jul, 24 & 31 Jul. |
| 18 Aug–20 Oct | Phù sa (Alluvial Soil) | 40 | VFC | Nguyễn Phương Điền (director); Đàm Diệu Anh, Nguyễn Thị Phương Tâm (writers); Lê Anh Thúy (editor); Trúc Mây, Lê Minh Thành, Huỳnh Anh, Bích Hằng, Việt Anh, Phương Bình, Khánh Tiên Leona, Triệu An, Hà Linh, Lâm Kha, Nguyễn Trọng Hải, Tấn Thi, Phạm Mạnh Hùng, Phạm Hùng, Huỳnh An, Ngọc Thảo, Tuyết Nương, Bùi Ngọc Thảo, Ngọc Mai, Hồng Anh, Ngân Châu, Bá Luân, Lý Phương Phương, Trâm Đặng, Thiên Lang, Thành Công, Bảo Tâm, Dương Tích Hiền, Minh Hoàng, Lâm Chí, Dũng Đô... | Khát vọng phù sa (Aspiration For Alluvial Soil) by Lex Vũ & Thanh Tâm, Vân Anh | Drama, Social, Rural, Romance | Delayed 4 eps on 20 & 28 Aug, 1 Oct, 5 & 12 Oct. 1 ep on 2 Sep due to National Day (Vietnam). |
| 21 Oct–present | Xóm nhỏ (Hamlet) | (Eps 25, from 27 Nov) | VFC | Bùi Quốc Việt (director); Trần Diệu Linh, Tiết Kim Oanh, Mai Búp (writers); Lại Phương Thảo (editor); Hoàng Hải, Lê Lưu Ly, Hà Thành, Thanh Tú, Lê Hoàng Long, Nguyễn Thùy Dương, Phạm Đình Hưng, Phùng Khánh Linh, Linh Huệ, Tùng Anh, Tiến Huy, Trần Bích Thủy, Nguyễn Phương Huyền My, Trần Bảo Nam, Trang Emma, Bùi Hoàng Mai, Lại Huy Hoàng, Nguyễn Thúy Nga, Vũ Mạnh Hùng, Triệu Thu Huyền... | Ngày đôi mươi (Twenty-Year-Old) by Nguyễn Nam Giang & Dương Thắm Cha vẫn nơi đây (Father is Still Here) by Nguyễn Nam Giang & Nguyễn Đức Anh | Drama, Family, Romance, Youth, Slice-of-Life | Delayed 3 eps on 30 Oct and 13 & 24 Nov. |
| 7 Dec 2026– (to be released) | Mặt trời không lặn (The Sun Never Sets) | 20 (expected) | VFC | Nguyễn Đức Hiếu (director); Trịnh Khánh Hà (eidtor); Lan Hương 'Bông', Đỗ Kỷ, Hoàng Công, Trọng Lân, Cù Thị Trà, Quang Sự, Hà Việt Dũng, Lương Thu Trang, Huỳnh Anh, Phùng Đức Hiếu, Nguyễn Hoàng Thúy Nga, Luân Nguyễn, Nguyễn Thị Mai Huê, Nguyễn Thanh Tuấn, Trương Hoàng, Ali Thục Phương... | | Crime, Drama, Political, Army | |

== VTV3 Weeknight Prime-time dramas ==
=== Monday-Wednesday dramas ===
These dramas air from 20:00 to 20:50, Monday to Wednesday on VTV3.

| Broadcast | Title | Eps. | Prod. | Cast and crew | Theme song(s) | Genre | Notes |
|---|---|---|---|---|---|---|---|
| 23 Feb–13 May | Bước chân vào đời (Stepping Into Life) | 36 | VFC | Nguyễn Danh Dũng (director); Hồng Thủy, Thanh Hương, Hồng Thu (writers); Trịnh Khánh Hà (editor); Quỳnh Kool, Nguyễn Ngọc Thủy, Nguyễn Sơn Tùng, Huỳnh Anh, Mạnh Trường, Lan Hương 'Bông', Quách Thu Phương, Ngọc Tản, Trịnh Mai Nguyên, Lê Xuân Anh, Trịnh Huyền, Trung Đức, Hoàng Anh Vũ, Vũ Thu Hoài, Lâm Nguyên, Đức Phong, Hoàng Hải Yến, Đào Ngọc Chi, Đinh Thu Hiền, Lưu Huyền Trang, Hoàng Công, Phan Thắng, Lý Chí Huy, Hoàng Huy, Việt Pháp, Đức Châu, Bùi Vũ Phong, Đăng Lâm, Bích Thủy, Hoàng Khánh Ly, Anh Đức, Khôi Nguyên, Thế Anh, Lê Hà, Nguyễn Trúc Anh, Hương Thủy, Vũ Minh Phương, Alex Long... / Hiểu Minh, Trần Lan Anh | Hãy cứ yêu đi (Just Keep Loving) & Lạc (Lost) by Phùng Tiến Minh & Minh Tiến, Tống Khang Đào liễu (Peach Blossom) by Thái Sơn | Drama, Romance, Family, Society, Business, Crime | |
| 18 May–29 Jul | Dưới ô cửa sáng đèn (Under the Brightly Lit Window) | 33 | VFC | Trịnh Lê Phong (director); Huyền Lê (writer); Đàm Vân Anh (editor); Quang Sự, Quỳnh Châu, Tuấn Tú, Hoàng Du Ka, Thanh Hương, Bùi Bài Bình, Chí Trung, Tú Oanh, Nguyễn Ngọc Huyền, Tiến Lộc, Trần Quốc Trọng, Minh Hiền, Lê Trần Thanh Tâm, Huyền Sâm, Nguyễn Tiến Ngọc, Đình Hưng, Mạnh Hưng, Linh Đan, Trần Hoàng, Đỗ Thế Gia Long, Hồ Lan, Thụy Hòa, Phùng Đức Hiếu, Hồ Liên, Tuyết Trinh, Thế Anh, Alex Long, Dương Thành Nam... / Anh Đức, Trịnh Khôi Nguyên, Minh Bùi, Nguyễn Trúc Anh, Gia Hân, Bảo Vy, Bi Bông; Cameo: Phạm Hùng Trường | Đồi hoa mặt trời (Hill of Sunflowers) by Nguyễn Văn Chung & Quỳnh Châu | Drama, Slice-of-Life, Family, Romance, Comedy, Business | |
| 3 Aug–7 Oct | Mùa hè năm ấy (That Summer) | 27; Pt.1: 10e Pt.2: 17e | VFC | Lê Đỗ Ngọc Linh (director); Thu Trang, Tuấn Dương, Mai Diệp (writers); Trịnh Khánh Hà (editor); Nguyễn Long Vũ/Tô Dũng, Lê Lưu Ly/Minh Thu, Nguyễn Trinh/Châu Dương, Hà Thành/Trọng Lân, Nguyễn Hoàng Hải/Phan Thắng, Vân Dung, Phạm Anh Tuấn, Hồng Hạnh, Phạm Tuấn Anh, Thùy Dương, Nông Thị Hằng/Cù Thị Trà, Đào Nguyễn Ánh/Lý Chí Huy, Minh Hải, Trình Mỹ Duyên, Lâm Đức Anh, Lệ Mỹ, Ngô Hoàng Bảo Châu/Tô Thắng, Khương Duy/Trung Kê, Hoàng Phương Thảo, Đinh Thu Hiền/Lê Linh Hương, Maya, Ngô Quân Anh, Đức Sơn/Trần Hoàng, Bình Nguyên Koka, Bùi Hoàng Mai, Phan Thương, Đức Tuấn Trần, Lê Khôi Nguyên, Vũ Mạnh Hùng, Thanh Tuyền, Phạm Hồng, Lê Hà, Alex Long, Trúc Quỳnh, Dương Phương, KaMi Anh... | Trái tim này được yêu em (This Heart Loves You) by Emcee L, Jean Quỳnh Anh & Jane Quỳnh Anh, Việt Anh Viết tiếp mùa hè năm ấy (Continuing the Story of That Summer) by Long Hách, Phạm Hồng Thái & Minh Thư, Nguyễn Long Vũ Lặng nhìn yêu thương (Silently Gazing At Love) by C-ROT, Ngô Hoàng Bảo Châu & Nguyễn Long Vũ Phút giây hiện tại (The Present Moment) by Đình Chung, GUrbane & Ngô Hoàng Bảo Châu | Drama, Scholastic, Family, Youth, Romance, Comedy | Formerly: Bạn đời hoàn hảo (The Perfect Partner) Delayed 3 eps on 10-11 Aug & 2 Sep due to National Mourning of the Chairman of the National Assembly of the Lao People's Democratic Republic, Xaysomphone Phomvihane and National Day (Vietnam). |
| 12 Oct 2026–present | Căn nhà không mái che (House Without A Roof) | (Eps 21, from 25 Nov) | VFC | Bùi Tiến Huy, Phạm Gia Phương (directors); Nguyễn Nhiệm, Lương Ly, Thùy Dương, Thủy Vũ (writers); Nguyễn Thu Thủy (editor); Lương Thu Hà, Phan Minh Huyền, Doãn Quốc Đam, Duy Hưng, Nhật Minh, Cao Phú Quý, Khánh An, Nguyễn Sơn Tùng, Nam Việt, Minh Cúc, Lan Hương 'Bông', Thúy Hà, Nguyễn Trường, Thanh Tùng, Trang Moon, Lê Hoàng Vũ, Nguyễn Tiến Ngọc, Nguyễn Trúc Anh, Vĩnh Xương, Dung Kim, Nguyễn Linh Chi, Lâm Nguyên, Trúc Quỳnh, Trần Quốc Việt, Lạc Thiên, Nguyễn Hồng Phi, Lại Huy Hoàng, Lâm Trí Lâm, Trần Thị Lan Anh, Trần Đại Linh, Jimmii Khánh, Lê Anh Trình, Lệ Mỹ, Bùi Văn Hoàn, Thanh Thúy, Nghiêm Khánh Linh, Hoàng Đức Tiến, Lạc Thiên, Nguyễn Hồng Phi... | Như một nhành hoa (Like A Branch of Flowers) by Dương Trường Giang & Nguyễn Việt Hùng, Vinh Khuất | Drama, Romance, Rural, Family, Comedy | |

=== Thursday-Friday dramas ===
These dramas air from 20:00 to 20:50, Thursday and Friday on VTV3.

- Note: Starting 29 Jan 2026, VTV will launch a series of high-quality miniseries in prime time (each with 16-20 episodes).

| Broadcast | Title | Eps. | Prod. | Cast and crew | Theme song(s) | Genre | Notes |
|---|---|---|---|---|---|---|---|
| 29 Jan–10 Apr | Đồng hồ đếm ngược (Countdown Timer) | 20 | VFC | Bùi Tiến Huy (director); Lương Ly, Nguyễn Nhiệm, Thùy Dương, Thủy Vũ, Đỗ Lê (writers); Nguyễn Thu Thủy (editor); Thanh Sơn, Hoàng Hà, Coddy, Linh Huệ, Bình An, Yến My, Bảo Hân, Quỳnh Dương, Hoa Thúy, Hoàng Huy, Ngọc Thu, Nguyễn Ngọc An Nhiên, Lan Phương, Hồng Đăng, Quách Thu Phương, Trung Anh, Phạm Tuấn Anh, Trọng Trinh, Lan Hương 'Bông', Đức Trung, Đặng Tất Bình, Phú Thăng, Việt Thắng, Thùy Liên, Đình Chiến, Trương Thu Hà, Tiến Ngọc, Hoàng Công, Ngô Lệ Quyên, Trần Thanh Chi, Thục Trang, Ngô Minh Hoàng, Việt Pháp, Hà Lê, Châu Xuân Ái, Doãn Thùy Linh, Lương Thanh Xuân, Xuân Đồng, Nguyễn Anh Tạo, Bích Tiệp, Lê Gia Khánh, Nguyễn Tú, Hoàng Anh Vũ, Lê Cát Tường, Tạ Vũ Thu, Tiến Việt, Hoàng Du Ka, Trần Ngọc Trâm, Anh Tài, Đỗ Anh Đức, Phạm Tuấn Phong, Phạm An... / Nhật Minh, Khánh An, Kim Oanh, Trịnh Gia Huy, Hoàng Ngọc Hải, Lý Chí Huy | Trò chuyện với thời gian (Talking With Time) by Tryle & 4rtus Cascadeur by Hà Anh, Hoàng Anh Vũ | Crime, Drama, Family, Fantasy, Comedy, Romance, Secret | First miniseries to air for this slot. Delayed 2 eps on 19-20 Feb due to Tet holiday. Airing from 20:00 to 20:55, epi 1-6. |
| 16 Apr–12 Jun | Lời hứa đầu tiên (The First Promise) | 18 | VFC | Nguyễn Đức Hiếu (director); Tuấn Dương, Thanh Hương (writers); Trịnh Khánh Hà (editor); Trang Emma, Quỳnh Dương, Trình Mỹ Duyên, Trần Việt Hoàng, Linh Sơn, Hoàng Anh Vũ, Maya, Hương Liên, Nguyễn Quỳnh Anh, Ngọc Tản, Viết Liên, Trọng Lân, Thái Dũng, Bùi Hồng Nhật Hà, Nguyễn Minh Phương, Phương Uyên, Phương Anh, Kim Dung, Quỳnh Anh, Phương Linh, Xuân Hậu, Anh Tuấn, Phí Thùy Linh, Lê Hà... / Huyền Sâm, Trương Quỳnh Anh, Quốc Quỳnh Liên | Sống cho hết đời thanh xuân 4 (Live Your Youth to the Fullest 4) & Rất muốn nắm lấy những vì sao (I Really Want to Reach For the Stars) by Huỳnh Công Hiếu & Ngắn, Xám | Drama, Hometown, Ethnic, Model, Beauty Pageant, Romance | |
| 18 Jun–28 Aug | Cảnh sát hình sự: Lửa trắng (Criminal Police: White Fire) | 22 | VFC | Bùi Quốc Việt (director); Vũ Liêm (writer); Nguyễn Trung Dũng, Đặng Diệu Hương (editors); Duy Hưng, Việt Hoa, Hồ Phong, Thu Quỳnh, Bảo Anh, Tuấn Cường, Nguyễn Mạnh Cường, Cù Thị Trà, Thanh Huế, Trương Hoàng, Phú Kiên, Thanh Tùng, Nông Dũng Nam, Nguyễn Tú, Lưu Duy Khánh, Nguyễn Thị Mai Huê, Nguyễn Trọng Nghĩa, Hoàng Du Ka, Phạm Tuấn Anh, Đinh Ngọc Anh, Linh Huệ, Đức Hùng, Xuân Hồng, Hoàng Ka Tê, Trần Trung Kiên, Xuân Thắng, Lê Trung Đông, Lê Đức Quân, Phương Anh, Trần Thành Đạt, Nguyễn Thị Khánh Huyền, Trần Hoàng Nhật, Thanh Nguyễn, Tuấn Hoàng, Nguyễn Dương, Cee Jay, Đức Sơn, Lê Hà, Nguyễn Thanh Thủy, Tùng Anh... / Đăng Lâm, Khánh An, Công Tiến, Hùng Dũng, Bùi Văn Sơn | Để bình minh trở lại (Let the Dawn Return) & Chẳng dám ngỏ lời (I Didn't Dare to Speak Up); Nguyễn Nam Giang & ft. Đức Anh, Mủn Gỗ | Crime, Drama, Political, Action | Supported by Drug Crime Investigation Police Department. |
| 3 Sep–27 Nov | Đội bóng nữ làng Xuân (Spring Village Women's Football Team) | 25 | VFC | Trần Trọng Khôi (director); Vũ Ngọc Bích, Lâm Mạnh Tùng (writers); Nguyễn Mạnh Cường (editor); Trung Anh, Trương Thảo My, Thanh Hương, Hồ Liên, Đan Lê, Diễm Hương, Ngọc Mai, Võ Hoài Vũ, Tuyết Trinh, Thụy Hòa, Tuấn Tú, Đức Khuê, Như Quỳnh, Đức Khuê, Vũ Mai Huê, Hà Trung, Thái Dương, Lê Hải, Quỳnh Dương, Trọng Trinh, Minh Cúc, Nguyễn Phương Nhã Đan, Bùi Hoàng Việt Anh, Ngọc Thư, Minh Tuấn, Hoàng Tùng, Lê Hoàng Long, Lê Hà, Nguyễn Thanh Thủy, Trần Minh Ngọc, Nguyễn Nam Giang, Thái Hòa, Xuân Phong, Thục Anh, Cù Quỳnh Anh, Phạm Văn Minh, Vũ Tuấn Hùng, Xuân Đức, Minh Chiến, Phạm Hồng, Vũ Mạnh Hùng, Thanh Tuyền, Nguyễn Ngọc Hoa Lê, Alex Long, Doãn Quốc Đam, Dương Thành Nam, Hà Đào Maria, Trịnh Vũ Thái Hòa, Ngân Giang Phan, Thu Thủy, Lê Hiếu, Minh Cường, Phương Hạnh, Trần Hoài Xuân Chi, Nguyễn Đắc Chính, Nguyễn Thúy Nga, Nguyễn Ánh Dương, Đình Sáng, Bùi Minh Phương, Nguyễn Văn Lục, Sóc Mật Nhỏ, Vũ Tuấn Việt, Huy Anh, Em Hà, Thanh Mai, Cô Vân, Kim Ngân, Trag Zizy, Hồ Đạt Mậu, Đào Ngọc Diệp, Đặng Hoa, Thái Hương, Đào Hòa, Trương Quang Ánh... / Minh Châu, Lương Thị Ngân, Thu Julie, Trần Hồng Vân | Trái tim tự do (Free Heart) by Nguyễn Nam Giang & Nguyễn Quỳnh Anh, Tùng Lâm, Bí đỏ, Bảo Hân, Ali Thục Phương | Drama, Sports, Rural, Comedy | Delayed 1 ep on 25 Sep due to Tết Trung Thu. The series is inspired by Vietnam Women's National Football Team. |
| 3 Dec 2026– (to be released) | Tình khúc bản gió (Love Song of the Wind) | 26 (expected) | VFC | Trịnh Lê Phong (director); Quỳnh Châu, Nguyễn Long Vũ, Lan Hương 'Bông', Quang Sự, Đình Tú, Kiều My, Võ Hoài Nam, Quỳnh Kool, Lê Đức Quân, Lê Trần Thanh Tâm, Hoàng Khánh Ly, Mạnh Hưng, Phạm Anh Tuấn, Hồng Nhung, Võ Hoài Vũ, Thừa Tuấn Anh... | | Drama, Romance, Comedy, Youth | Delayed 2 eps on 4-5 Feb 2027 due to Tet holiday. |

== VTV3 - Weekend Drama Series ==
=== Saturday dramas ===
These dramas air from 21:30 to 22:30 (from 7 Mar, one episode per week; previously 2 episodes per week from 21:30 to 23:10), Saturday on VTV3.

- Note: Starting from 17 Oct, this drama slot will be replaced by TV show Sinh viên thế hệ mới (New Generation Students). This time slot was closed for almost 1 year.

| Broadcast | Title | Eps. | Prod. | Cast and crew | Theme song(s) | Genre | Notes |
|---|---|---|---|---|---|---|---|
| 7 Mar–1 Aug | Tiểu tam không có lỗi? (The Mistress is not at Fault?) | 22; Original: 28 | VieON | Trần Bửu Lộc (director); Ngọc Anh, Tuyết Mai, Tuyết Lan, Ngọc Huyền (writers); Trình Mỹ Duyên, Tam Triều Dâng, Trâm Anh, Ammy Minh Khuê, Phi Hùng, Văn Anh, Quốc Huy, Thanh Thúy, Kim Nhã, Thoại Tiên, Otis Đỗ Nhật Trường, Cao Thuỳ Linh, Thanh Ngọc, Tiko Tiến Công, Lam Phượng, Hữu Vi, Lan Hương 'Bông', Lê Khanh, Đức Sơn, Bích Hằng, Phi Phụng, Lâm Thanh Sơn... | Yêu nhiêu lần yêu cuối (Love Many Times, Love for the Last Time) & Em đã thuộc về ai? (Who do you Belong To?) by Hellen Hoàng hôn nhớ (Sunset Memories) by Chí Kiên Về với em (Back to Me) by Võ Hạ Trâm | Crime, Drama, Romance | The drama was released on VieON in late 2024 - early 2025. |
| 8 Aug–10 Oct | Cuộc chiến hạ lưu (Downstream War) | 9 Original: 12 | VieON | Tô Gia Tuấn (director); Nhi Bùi, Stefanie Võ, Hoa Trà (writers); Ngọc Khanh, Tô Gia Tuấn (editors); Thái Hòa, Lê Phương, Kim Phương, Trịnh Thảo, Tuyết Nhung, Bảo Nam, Ngân Quỳnh, Thanh Nam, Phúc An, Tiểu Bảo Quốc, Võ Ngọc Trai, Công Ninh, Trần Nhậm, Thiết Yến, Xuân Phúc, Quang Sơn, Di Dương, Năm Trà, Tuyền Mập, Hồng Trang, Ku Vàng, Trịnh Tú Trung, Phương Rock, Nông Hữu Nghĩa, Nguyễn Thị Thủy, Phạm Ngọc Hiền, Phan Thị Tuyết Anh, Nguyễn Duy Hoàng, Nguyễn Thị Thanh Trang, Đoàn Phước Hiếu, Trương Tấn Quang, Vũ Thị Hương Thơm, Phạm Thị Kim Liên... | Nơi ta gọi là nhà (The Place We Call Home) by Tăng Nhật Tuệ, Anh Tú | Drama, War, Slice-of-Life, Family | The drama was released on VieON in late 2025. Delayed 1 ep on 3 Oct. |

=== Sunday dramas ===
These dramas air from 21:00 to 22:00, Sunday on VTV3 (with 2 episodes/per day, 21:00 to 22:50).

- Note: Starting 3 May, VTV3 will launch a new time slot airing on Sunday evenings. Starting 21 Jun, the Sunday night drama series will air one episode (from 21:00 to 21:50) due to the 2026 FIFA World Cup. This time slot was closed after 1 series.

| Broadcast | Title | Eps. | Prod. | Cast and crew | Theme song(s) | Genre | Notes |
|---|---|---|---|---|---|---|---|
| 3 May–28 Jun | Tận hiến (Dedication) | 15 | People's Police Cinema | Trần Ka My (director); Trịnh Thanh Nhã, Nguyễn Thị Thu Huệ, Lê Anh Thúy (writers); Nguyễn Quang Vinh (editor); Hứa Vĩ Văn, Đàm Hằng, Nguyễn Phương Nam, Ngọc Thanh Tâm, Hồ Phong, Tiến Lộc, Tuấn Quang, Tạ Minh Thảo, Bá Anh, Thanh Dương, Nguyễn Hùng Sơn, Nguyễn Mạnh Hà, Trung Anh, Trần Nhượng, Minh Hòa, Trần Đức, Hoàng Ka Tê, Bình Xuyên, Bùi Minh Phương, Viết Liên, Danh Thái, Minh Cúc, Subin, Quốc Quân, Hoàng Du Ka, Trần Ngọc Yến, Thanh Trà Ari, Cami Lam Anh, Bùi Quỳnh Như, Jackie Tuấn Anh, Phạm Đình Anh, Diệp Thanh Phong, Vĩnh Xương, Nguyễn Tiến Huy, Hồng Ma, Vương Trọng Trí, Bùi Sỹ Tự, Thy Mai, Corb Vil, Charlie Winston, Trey Rives, Phan Thắng, Đỗ Định, Vũ Đức Hải, Nguyễn Trọng Nghĩa, Đức Sơn, Lý Hùng, Hoàng Khải, Nguyễn Trọng Hoàn, Bá Hân, Hoàng Tuấn, Nguyễn Vượng, China Keobounla, Hoàng Tiphu, Mạnh Chung, Lê Điệp, Hà Đào, Phạm Gia Khuê, Vũ Mai Huê, Quách Xuân Thùng, Ngọc Diệp, Vũ Đức Trung, Đặng Hiền Binh, Bùi Nam Kì, Nguyễn Văn Hòa, Lê Quý Đôn, Malisa Simmany, Thụy Hòa, Thiên Lâm, Mạnh Hùng, Anh Quân, Cảnh Bùi, Doãn Tuấn Minh, Phương Râu, Trương Quốc Anh, Hugo, Phương Anh, Trần Võ Hoài Phương, Hoàng Thành Long... / Trung Đức | Dâng hiến (Dedication) by Minh Đạo | Crime, Drama, Political, Period, History | The film portrays the life and silent dedication of intelligence officer Nguyễn Thành (codename P1), who contributed to the success of many major campaigns during the struggle for national reunification in the 1960–1970. The film was broadcast on ANTV channel at 21:10 every Sat and Sun starting 9 May (and also on HTV9 channel at 22:00 Mon-Thu starting 27 Jul). Aired 3 eps on 31 May (ep 9), 21 Jun (ep 14) and 28 Jun (ep 15). |

== Non-recurring dramas ==
The drama was released outside of the regular drama time slot. It airs from 13:00 to 13:45, Monday to Friday on VTV3.

| Broadcast | Title | Eps. | Prod. | Cast and crew | Theme song(s) | Genre | Notes |
|---|---|---|---|---|---|---|---|
| 29 Sep–2 Oct | Followed by the playback of Yêu hơn cả bầu trời (Sky-high Love), 4 episodes. The drama was first released on VTV1 channel in 2021. | | | | | | |
| 5–29 Oct | Followed by the playback of Lý Công Uẩn: Đường tới thành Thăng Long (Lý Công Uẩn: The Road to Thăng Long), 19 episodes. The drama was first released on VTV5 channel in 2025 (produced in 2009). | | | | | | |
| 30 Oct–20 Nov | Followed by the playback of Kế hoạch CM-12 (CM12 Plan), 16 episodes. The drama was first released on HTV7 channel. | | | | | | |

== See also ==
- List of dramas broadcast by Vietnam Television (VTV)
- List of dramas broadcast by Hanoi Radio Television (HanoiTV)
- List of dramas broadcast by Vietnam Digital Television (VTC)
