= 2025 in Vietnam =

- Decades: 2000s; 2010s; 2020s
- See also: Other events of 2025; History of Vietnam; Timeline of Vietnamese history; List of years in Vietnam

Events in the year 2025 in Vietnam.

== Incumbents ==
- General Secretary of the Communist Party of Vietnam – Tô Lâm
- President of Vietnam – Lương Cường
- Prime Minister of Vietnam – Phạm Minh Chính
- Chairman of the National Assembly – Trần Thanh Mẫn

== Events ==
=== February ===
- 21 February – A bus crashes into a back of a tractor in Son La Province, killing six people and injuring eight others.

=== March ===
- 28 March – A magnitude 7.7 earthquake with an epicenter in Myanmar shakes multiple areas of Vietnam, damaging 400 apartments in Ho Chi Minh City and indirectly killing one person in the city's District 8.

=== April ===
- 4 April – In a phone call with U.S. President Donald Trump on 4 April, the General Secretary of the Communist Party of Vietnam Tô Lâm offers a "0%" tariff on American goods in exchange for lowering and eliminating tariffs against Vietnam.

=== May ===
- 19 May – Beauty queen Nguyễn Thúc Thùy Tiên is arrested for consumer fraud after promoting a counterfeit fiber supplement on social media.
- 21 May – A court in Hanoi convicts former Deputy Minister of Natural Resources and Environment Nguyễn Linh Ngọc and 26 others of offenses that include "violating state regulations causing wastefulness", causing pollution and violating regulations on natural resources exploitation over the illegal grant of a mining license in Yen Bai province and sentences them to up to 16 years' imprisonment.
- 23 May – The government orders the blocking of Telegram for failing to cooperate in criminal investigations involving its users.
- 30 May – 18-year-old Đỗ Ngọc Phương Thùy is killed by a speeding car in Hanoi.

=== June ===
- 4 June – The government officially lifts restrictions that allowed couples to have only up to two children since 1988 amid falling birth rates.
- 7–14 June – The 2025 AVC Women's Volleyball Nations Cup is held in Hanoi, with Vietnam winning the gold medal after defeating the Philippines 3–0 in the final.
- 11–14 June – Eleven people are reported killed in flooding caused by Tropical Storm Wutip.
- 12 June – The National Assembly approves a proposal to reduce the number of provinces and cities of Vietnam from 63 to 34.
- 25 June – The National Assembly abolishes the use of the death penalty in punishing property embezzlement, bribe-taking, espionage, graft and attempting to overthrow the government.

=== July ===
- 2 July – US president Donald Trump announces a trade agreement in Vietnam in which a 20% tariff would be charged on Vietnamese products while no tariffs would be imposed on American products.
- 19 July – A tourist boat capsizes amid bad weather in Hạ Long Bay, leaving 39 people dead.
- 22 July – Tropical Storm Wipha makes landfall over northern Vietnam, leaving one person dead in Nghệ An province and another missing.

=== August ===
- 1 August – Flooding in Điện Biên province leaves 14 people dead or missing.
- 25 August – Typhoon Kajiki makes landfall over central Vietnam, killing four people and injuring 13 others.

=== September ===
- 24 September – Hương Giang becomes the first transgender person to be crowned Miss Universe Vietnam. She is also the first transgender person to represent an Asian country in the Miss Universe pageant franchise.
- 25 September – Forty-three people are sentenced to up to 13 years' imprisonment for involvement in an illegal online gambling network containing 20,000 users with around 25 million accounts and $3.8 billion in transactions.
- 25 September – 16 October – 2025 Northern Vietnam floods
- 28 September – Typhoon Bualoi makes landfall over Hà Tĩnh province, killing least 57 people, injuring 172 others, and leaving 10 missing.
- 30 September – Former Saigon Jewelry Company CEO Le Thuy Hang and 15 other company officials are convicted and sentenced to up to 25 years' imprisonment for embezzling $2.7 million in funds and misdeclaring loss rates in gold processing to skim the mineral from 2021 to 2024.

=== October ===
- 5 October – A magnitude 4.8 earthquake hits Quảng Ngãi province, damaging several structures in Kon Plông District.
- 10 October – At least 16 people are killed nationwide in flooding and landslides caused by Typhoon Matmo.
- 16 October – 2025 Central Vietnam floods

=== November ===
- 5 November – At least 47 people are reported killed and eight others missing following days of the first period of flooding and landslides caused by heavy rains in central Vietnam.
- 7 November – Typhoon Kalmaegi makes landfall over the provinces of Gia Lai and Đắk Lắk, killing at least six people, injuring 26 others, collapsing 2,365 houses and damaging 57,498 houses.
- 13 November – At least 66 people are reported killed and missing following days of the first period of flooding and landslides, along with Typhoon Kalmaegi, in central Vietnam.
- 16 November – At least six people are killed and 19 others are injured when a landslide triggered by heavy rain strikes a bus carrying 32 passengers in Khánh Hòa province.
- 25 November – At least 98 people are reported killed and 10 others missing following days of the second period of flooding caused by heavy rains in south-central Vietnam.
- 28 November – Montagnard activist Y Quynh Bđăp is extradited by Thai authorities to Vietnam, where he had been convicted in absentia on charges related to the 2023 Đắk Lắk attacks.
- 30 November - The Prime Minister launched the Quang Trung Campaign (2025–2026) to address the aftermath of natural disasters, completing the repair and construction of houses in the Central and Central Highlands regions.

=== December ===
- 4 December – Two people are killed in flooding caused by heavy rains in Lam Dong province.
- 9—20 December — Vietnam at the 2025 SEA Games
- 27 December – A bus carrying charity workers overturns in Phình Hồ, Lào Cai province, killing nine people and injuring eight others.

== Holidays ==
Sources:

- 1–2 January – New Year's Day
- 28 January-3 February – Vietnamese New Year
- 7 April – Hung Kings Commemoration Day
- 30 April – Reunification Day
- 1 May – Labour Day
- 2 September – National Day

== Deaths ==
- 20 May – Trần Đức Lương, 88, president (1997–2006)
- 1 October – Thế Hiển, 69, singer and musician

== Art and entertainment ==
- List of Vietnamese submissions for the Academy Award for Best International Feature Film
