= 2022 in Vietnam =

- Decades: 2000s; 2010s; 2020s
- See also: Other events of 2022; History of Vietnam; Timeline of Vietnamese history; List of years in Vietnam

Events in the year 2022 in Vietnam.

== Incumbents ==
- General Secretary of the Communist Party – Nguyễn Phú Trọng
- President – Nguyễn Xuân Phúc
- Prime Minister – Phạm Minh Chính
- Chairman of the National Assembly – Vương Đình Huệ

== Events ==
- Ongoing: COVID-19 pandemic in Vietnam
- 20 January – The country reports its first three locally transmitted cases of the SARS-CoV-2 Omicron variant in Ho Chi Minh City.
- 1 February – Vietnam national football team surprisingly wins against China at the 2022 FIFA World Cup qualification – AFC third round.
- 15 February – Vietnam lifts its COVID-19-related curbs on international passenger flights with no limitation on the number of flights in order to restore the travel to pre-pandemic level.
- 12–23 May – 2021 SEA Games take place in Hanoi.
- 22 May – The Vietnam national under-23 football team won against Thailand in the gold medal match of men's football at the 2021 SEA Games, many Vietnamese people took to the streets to celebrate.
- 6 September – A karaoke bar fire near Ho Chi Minh City kills at least 32 people.

== Deaths ==
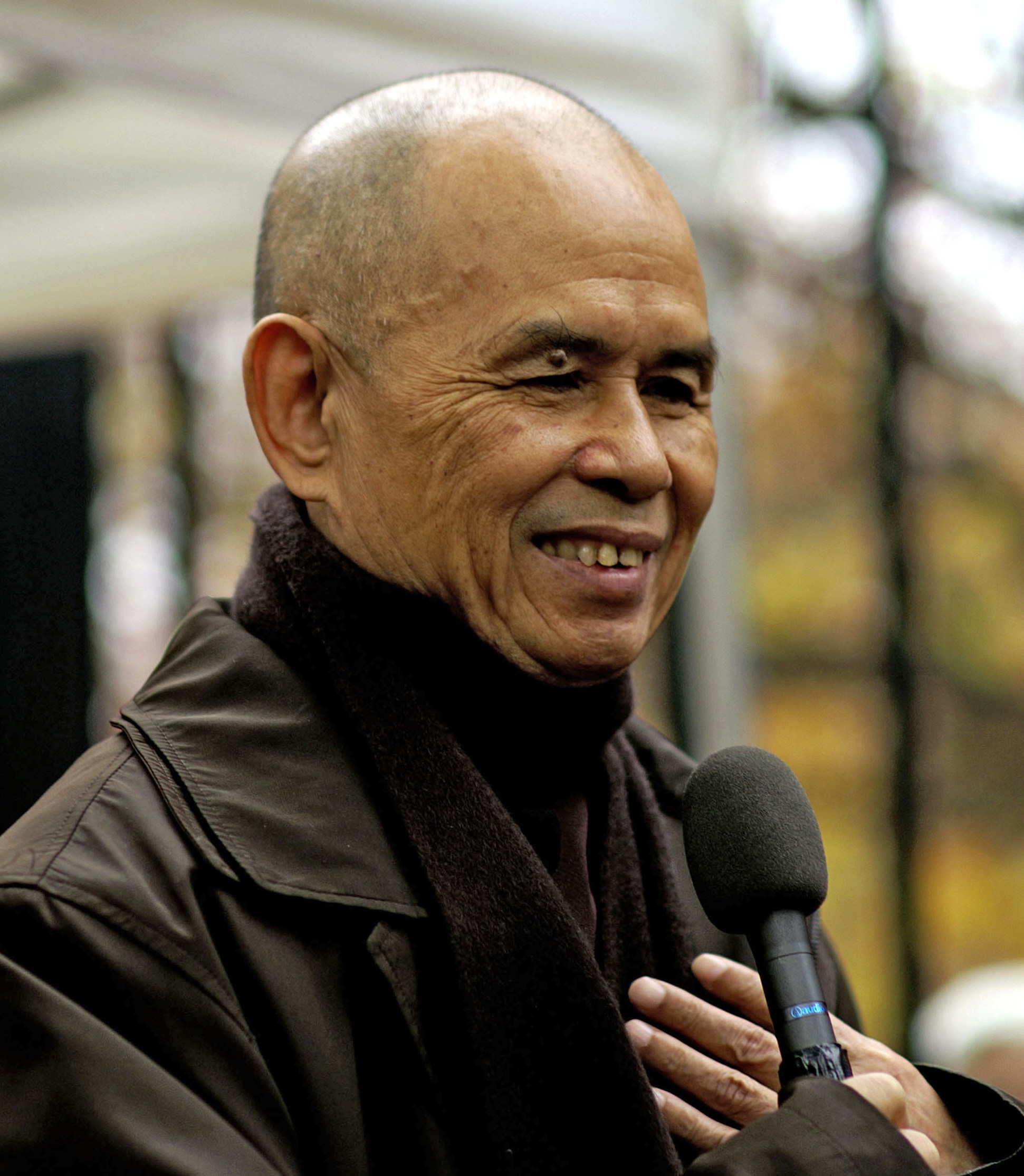
Thích Nhất Hạnh

- 9 January – Nguyễn Côn, politician, deputy prime minister (b. 1916).
- 22 January – Thích Nhất Hạnh, Zen Buddhist monk (b. 1926).
- 25 March – Nguyễn Hữu Việt, Olympic swimmer (b. 1988)
- 4 May – Nguyễn Duy Quý, academic and politician (b. 1932)
- 6 July – Tricia, Vietnamese-born Australian Asian elephant (b. 1957)
- 23 July – Nguyễn Xuân Vinh, aerospace engineer and military officer (b. 1930)
- 29 August – Paul-Marie Cao Ðình Thuyên, Roman Catholic prelate (b. 1927)
- 6 September – Thẩm Thúy Hằng, actress (b. 1939)
- 12 October – Ngo Vinh Long, Vietnamese-American historian (b. 1944)
- 9 November – Lê Lựu, writer (b. 1942)
