= 2023 in Vietnam =

- Decades: 2000s; 2010s; 2020s
- See also: Other events of 2023; History of Vietnam; Timeline of Vietnamese history; List of years in Vietnam

Events in the year 2023 in Vietnam.

== Incumbents ==
- General Secretary of the Communist Party of Vietnam – Nguyễn Phú Trọng
- President of Vietnam
  - Nguyễn Xuân Phúc (until 18 January);
  - Võ Thị Ánh Xuân; (18 January to March 2)
  - Võ Văn Thưởng (since March 2)
- Prime Minister of Vietnam – Phạm Minh Chính
- Chairman of the National Assembly – Vương Đình Huệ

== Events ==
=== January ===
- 17 January – Nguyễn Xuân Phúc resigns as President of Vietnam, the second highest-ranked position in Vietnam, citing responsibility for several recent scandals in the government.

=== February ===
- 16 February – A Da Nang court sentences four South Korean men to imprisonment for smuggling around 200 South Koreans into Vietnam during the COVID-19 pandemic when the country suspended the entry of all foreigners from 2020 to 2021.

=== March ===
- 2 March – The National Assembly of Vietnam elects Võ Văn Thưởng as the country's new president, replacing Nguyễn Xuân Phúc.

=== April ===
- 5 April – Five people are killed when a helicopter crashes near Hạ Long Bay, Quảng Ninh province.
- 6 April – TikTok is being searched and investigated by Vietnam due to the "toxic content" that harms the children.

=== June ===
- 11 June – 2023 Đắk Lắk attacks – Several people are killed and several others are injured in a mass shooting at a police station in the Central Highlands. Six people are arrested in connection with the shooting.

=== July ===
- July 14 – Zing News Online Knowledge electronic magazine site closed for 3 months due to the Decision on sanctioning administrative violations of the Inspectorate of the Ministry of Information and Communications on July 14, 2023, and the decision of the Vietnam Publishing Association Male.
- July 22 – Miss World Vietnam 2023 final held in Bình Định province.

=== August ===
- August 12 – A traffic accident between two trucks and a 4-seat car carrying Hoang Anh Gia Lai FC members on Highway 14 in Chu Puh district, Gia Lai province killed 3 people (including Mr. Doctor Dao Tri, assistant coach Duong Minh Ninh and striker Paollo Madeira)
- August 19–26 – VTV Cup 2023 international women's volleyball tournament.

=== September ===
- September 9 – Cánh Diều Awards 2023
- September 10–11 – Joe Biden visits Vietnam
- 12 September – 2023 Hanoi building fire: A fire at a 9-story apartment building in Hanoi, kills at least 56 people and hospitalizes 37 others.
- 29 September – Miss Universe Vietnam 2023 held in Ho Chi Minh City.

=== October ===
- October 6 – National Football Super Cup 2023
- October 8 – The final of Road to Olympia year number 23
- October 14 – Miss Earth Vietnam 2023 held in Ho Chi Minh City
- From October 20 – COVID-19 is no longer a particularly dangerous infectious disease (group A)
- October 25 – Miss Grand International 2023
- October 29 – Decision 3983/QD-BYT, annulling 160 documents on COVID-19 epidemic prevention and control issued by the Ministry of Health, takes effect

=== December ===
- December 22 – Miss Earth 2023

=== Sports ===
- 3 February – 20 August: 2023 V.League 1
- 4 February – 19 August: 2023 V.League 2

== Deaths ==
=== January ===
- January 6 – Nguyễn Thọ Chân, Former Minister of Labor of Vietnam (b. 1922)
- January 26 – Võ Văn Ái, poet, journalist (b. 1935)
- January 29 – Lê Dũng, Brigadier (b. 1967)
