= 2027 in Vietnam =

- Decades: 2000s; 2010s; 2020s
- See also: Other events of 2027; History of Vietnam; Timeline of Vietnamese history; List of years in Vietnam

Events in the year 2027 in Vietnam.

== Events ==
=== Predicted or scheduled ===
- 2026–27 V.League 1

== Holidays ==
Sources:

- 1 January – New Year's Day
- 16–20 February – Vietnamese New Year
- 26 April – Hung Kings Commemoration Day
- 30 April – Reunification Day
- 1 May – Labour Day
- 1–2 September – National Day
- 24 November – Culture Day
