= 2026 in Vietnam =

- Decades: 2000s; 2010s; 2020s
- See also: Other events of 2026; History of Vietnam; Timeline of Vietnamese history; List of years in Vietnam

Events in the year 2026 in Vietnam.

== Incumbents ==
- General Secretary of the Communist Party – Tô Lâm
- President
  - Lương Cường (until 7 April)
  - Tô Lâm (since 7 April)
- Prime Minister
  - Phạm Minh Chính (until 7 April)
  - Lê Minh Hưng (from 7 April)
- Chairman of the National Assembly – Trần Thanh Mẫn

== Events ==
=== January ===
- 19–23 January – 14th National Congress of the Communist Party of Vietnam
- 21 January
  - Police arrest 28 people, including several foreigners, for trading marijuana through online listings and chat groups.
  - Techcombank and Panasonic Vietnam sign a memorandum of understanding to develop a banking ecosystem.
- 23 January – 14th National Congress of the Communist Party of Vietnam: Tô Lâm is reelected for a five-year term as party general secretary.
- 28 January – A Yakovlev Yak-130 of the Vietnam Air Defence - Air Force crashes into a mountain in Đắk Lắk province, the pilot successfully ejected.

=== February ===
- 2 February – The defence ministry signs a $250 million agreement with Israeli company Rafael Advanced Defense Systems to produce Spike anti-tank missiles locally.

=== March ===
- 1 March – Vietnam's artificial intelligence (AI) law takes effect, mandating labeling of AI-generated content and disclosure when users interact with automated systems. The law, which applies to domestic and foreign developers, providers, and deployers operating in the country, also provides for the creation of a national AI data center.
- 15 March – 2026 Vietnamese legislative election
- 19 March – Independent journalist Nguyễn Hoàng Vi is arrested and beaten by police officers after posting critical comments over the 2026 Vietnamese legislative election on social media.
- 29 March – Miss World Vietnam 2025

=== April ===
- 7 April – 2026 Vietnamese presidential election: General Secretary Tô Lâm is elected as the 15th President of Vietnam and Lê Minh Hưng is appointed as the 9th Prime Minister of Vietnam.
- 14–17 April – General Secretary and president Tô Lâm and his spouse Ngô Phương Ly undertake a state visit to China.
- 21–24 April – South Korean president Lee Jae Myung pays a state visit to Vietnam per invitation by Tô Lâm.
- 22–30 April – Vietnam at the 2026 Asian Beach Games
- 24 April – The National Assembly passes a resolution establishing Đồng Nai as a centrally-governed city based on the current Đồng Nai province, effective from 30 April.
- 28 April – Tô Lâm appoints five ambassadors to foreign countries (Trịnh Minh Mạnh as ambassador to India, Nguyễn Hương Trà as ambassador to Belgium, Doãn Khánh Tâm as ambassador to North Korea, Châu Mai Anh as ambassador to Switzerland, and Nguyễn Thành Lê as ambassador to Kazakhstan).
- 30 April – Đồng Nai becomes a centrally-governed city.

=== May ===
- 1–3 May – Japanese prime minister Sanae Takaichi visits Vietnam per invitation from Prime Minister Lê Minh Hưng.
- 4 May
  - Prime Minister Lê Minh Hưng holds his first regular meeting of the government.
- 5–7 May – General Secretary and President Tô Lâm visits India per invitation from Prime Minister Narendra Modi.
- 7–8 May
  - Prime Minister Lê Minh Hưng goes to Cebu, Philippines to attend the 48th ASEAN Summit per invitation from President Bongbong Marcos, this was his first overseas trip as the new government.
  - General Secretary and President Tô Lâm visits Sri Lanka per invitation from President Anura Kumara Dissanayake.
- 10 May – A major fire breaks out at a textile factory in Nhơn Trạch, Đồng Nai.
- 11–13 May – 11th National Congress of the Vietnam Fatherland Front.
- 14 May – The Vietnam national under-17 football team qualifies to the FIFA U-17 World Cup for the first time, after defeating the United Arab Emirates 3–2 on the last group stage match at the AFC U-17 Asian Cup.
- 17 May – Công An Hà Nội defeat Dong A Thanh Hoa 2–0 to become the 2025–26 V.League 1 champions.
- 25 May – Two Samoan nationals are charged by Vietnamese police with killing the Australian gang leader Lorenzo Lemalu and wounding an associate in Ho Chi Minh City.
- 27–29 May – General Secretary and President Tô Lâm visits Thailand per invitation from Prime Minister Anutin Charnvirakul.
- 29–31 May – General Secretary and President Tô Lâm visits Singapore per invitation from President Tharman Shanmugaratnam and will attend the Shangri-La Dialogue.
- 31 May – 1 June – General Secretary and President Tô Lâm visits the Philippines per invitation from President Bongbong Marcos

=== June ===
- 3–5 June – 14th Congress of the Vietnam General Confederation of Labour.
- 6 June – Two business owners in Quảng Trị province are prosecuted for selling counterfeit goods bearing famous brand names.
- 7 June – A Train SE19 and a truck collide in Thường Tín, Hanoi, with no casualties.
- 7–8 June – 9th Congress of the Vietnam Farmers' Association.
- 9–10 June – ASEAN Future Forum 2026 in Hanoi.

=== July ===
- 11 July – A speedboat carrying 32 tourists and four crew members capsizes near Phu Quoc, killing 15 Indian tourists.
- 17 July — Four people are killed in a flash flood at the village of Mường Than in Lai Châu province.
- 24 July – The United States imposes a 12.5% tariff on Vietnam, citing the presence of alleged forced labor in the supply chain.
- 25 July – The ship Khôi Nguyên 18 capsizes near Discovery Great Reef due to bad weather, leaving 18 missing and 45 rescued.

=== September ===
- 3 September – Eleven people are sentenced to death over a 2023 drug trafficking case involving staff at Vietnam Airlines and Vietnamese nationals residing in France.
- 5 September – The Miss World 2026 pageant is held in Nha Trang.
- 7 September – A hotel fire in Ho Chi Minh City leaves two dead.
- 8 September – Three people are killed and one person is injured when a car and a motorbike collide in Đồng Nai.
- 19 September–4 October – Vietnam at the 2026 Asian Games

=== Predicted and scheduled ===
- 20 November – 12 December – 2026 Vietnam National Games

== Holidays ==
Sources:

- 1 January – New Year's Day
- 16–20 February – Vietnamese New Year
- 26 April – Hung Kings Commemoration Day
- 30 April – Reunification Day
- 1 May – Labour Day
- 1–2 September – National Day
- 24 November – Culture Day

== Deaths ==
- 6 February – Đoàn Duy Thành, 96, deputy chairman of the Council of Ministers (1987–1988).
- 22 March – Phạm Minh Mẫn, 92, Roman Catholic cardinal and archbishop of Ho Chi Minh City (1998–2014).
