= 2025 Hanoi car crash =

Traffic collision in Hanoi

- Date: 30 May 2025
- Time: 13:15 ICT (UTC+7)
- Location: Nguyễn Huy Tự Street, Bạch Đằng Ward, Hai Bà Trưng District, Hanoi, Vietnam (now Hai Bà Trưng Ward, Hanoi, Vietnam); 21.0136°N 105.8605°E
- Type: Head-on collision Crime scene getaway
- Perpetrator: Nguyễn Sỹ Cương
- Deaths: 1 (Đỗ Ngọc Phương Thùy)
- Injuries: 1 (Đỗ Việt Hùng)

On 30 May 2025, a black BMW X3 caused a fatal traffic accident on Nguyễn Huy Tự Street, Bạch Đằng ward, Hai Bà Trưng district (now Hai Bà Trưng ward), Hanoi, Vietnam. It resulted in one death and one injury. Vietnamese state media initially identified the driver only by the initials "N.S.C."; however, social media users and the overseas newspaper Nguoi Viet later claimed that the driver involved was Nguyễn Sỹ Cương, a member of the Communist Party of Vietnam and a former deputy of the 14th National Assembly. On 17 August 2026, the Hanoi City Police confirmed that Cương was the driver involved in the accident, and that he would be exonerated after the deceased victim's family decided not to press charges.

== Accident ==
On 30 May 2025, at approximately 13:15 UTC+7, a black BMW X3, registered as '30H-369.09', was traveling along Nguyễn Huy Tự Street before suddenly veering into the oncoming lane, accelerating, and colliding with a motorbike carrying a man and his 18-year old daughter in the opposite direction. The car lost control and crashed into a nearby tree, sustaining severe damage to its front end. The accident damaged the motorcycle and resulted in the man suffering a broken leg, while the girl sustained a traumatic amputation of her right leg. Police tested the driver for alcohol and found no violation.

On June 8, an account named Đỗ Quang Minh (relative of the victim) confirmed the death of the girl before she was scheduled to take the 2025 High School Graduation Examination. According to the post, the victim is named Thùy, whom the family called Mina. On June 10, her funeral notice was published online. According to the notice she died at 22:07 local time on June 7, 2025. The memorial service was held on June 11, at the National Funeral Home in Hanoi.

== Investigation ==
=== Identity of the BMW driver ===
Vietnamese state media initially did not explicitly identify the driver of the BMW involved in the accident by name, publishing only the initials "N.S.C." and their year of birth, 1961. According to the overseas Vietnamese newspaper Người Việt, this information matches that of Nguyễn Sỹ Cương, a former deputy of the 14th National Assembly of Vietnam and Deputy Chairman of the National Assembly's Foreign Affairs Committee. According to Đất Việt và Người Việt, he was neither arrested nor prosecuted. Nguyễn Lâm Phúc, the son of Nguyễn Sỹ Cương, posted a message on social media confirming that "my family has been involved in an unfortunate accident with consequences that could be described as serious."

According to Luật khoa tạp chí, a witness reported the presence of Cương's wife Lâm Thị Phương Thanh at the scene, who at the time served on the Executive Committee and the Standing Committee of the Party Committee for Central Party Agencies. Although the magazine could not independently verify the witness's account, it stated there were "grounds to believe" the claims made. Additionally, a video circulated on Vietnamese social media showing a woman on the passenger side leaving the car at the scene of the accident. The New York Times noted that she strongly resembles Thanh. She stepped out of the passenger seat as a crowd gathered, walked away from the scene, returned to retrieve an item from the front seat, and then left.

On 17 August 2026, Hanoi Metropolitan Police confirmed that Cương was the driver of the car.

=== Official response ===
On 17 August 2026, on VTV1's nightly news programme Thời sự, Senior Colonel Nguyễn Đức Long of Hanoi Metropolitan Police stated that it had investigated the accident and handled the case in accordance with legal procedures. Cương was confirmed as the driver, with the cause of the accident determined to be him driving on the wrong side of the road, in violation of regulations governing participation in road traffic as specified in Clause 1, Article 260 of the 2015 Criminal Code. However, Long claimed Cương was exempted from criminal prosecution as he met the conditions specified in Clause 3, Article 2 of the Code, though without mention of which conditions he had met. It was also reported that he admitted his guilt and helped remedy the consequences, and that the victim’s family accepted the investigation findings without objection and requested that he be exempted from criminal prosecution, expressing their wish for the matter to be resolved promptly so that they could return to a stable life.

Ngô Hồng Sơn, Deputy Chief of Hanoi People's Procuracy, stated that the procuracy assigned prosecutors to coordinate with the investigating authorities and agencies to examine the scene and collect evidence immediately after the accident occurred; regarding the procedural decisions made by the Police Investigation Agency, the procuracy conducted a review and determined that the decisions were well-founded and in accordance with the law.

Lawyer Nguyễn Hồng Bách from Hồng Bách & Associates Law Firm explained the law is applied nationwide and not selectively, with all traffic accidents subject to the same standards, which means investigative agencies assess the circumstances and conduct involved in each case; therefore, where Clause 1, Article 260 of the Code applies, authorities determine whether the statutory conditions for exemption from criminal prosecution are met and, if so, proceed accordingly.

Major General Nguyễn Quốc Toản, spokesperson for the Ministry of Public Security, stated that recent online discussions have been exploited by groups he described as "terrorist organizations," "reactionary forces," and "other hostile or malicious actors"—such as Việt Tân—to "disseminate misinformation and incite unrest." Toản claimed that these actors "deliberately strung together the aforementioned isolated incidents, along with several other cases" in an effort to "influence and manipulate young people, students, and cause a disruption of public order and security." He also urged the public to remain vigilant by and refrain from sharing "unverified information".

== Aftermath ==
=== 2025 ===
The accident attracted widespread attention on social media platforms. While information and appeals related to the accident spread widely, domestic press agencies provided relatively limited coverage. Unofficial sources questioned whether articles in Vietnam were initially removed or had their content adjusted to downplay the severity of the accident, ultimately suspecting the authorities of covering up the case. Some questioned how Cương could own a luxury vehicle when the 2025 civil servant salary was only about "over ten million dong" (equivalent to US$382 as of 2026) a month.

State-sponsored newspaper Dân Trí claimed that the case file was quickly transferred to the Police Investigation Agency of Hanoi Metropolitan Police to be handled and investigated. However, other sources including Đất Việt and Người Việt stated that, in reality, Cương's identity was not disclosed and he was not detained or prosecuted according to the Vietnamese laws, in which Article 147 of the 2015 Criminal Procedure Code stated that an investigating agency must examine the matter and issue a decision within 20 days of receiving a denunciation, crime report, or recommendation to prosecute, with a maximum limit of four months by permitted extensions. Singer Nguyễn Lâm Phúc, Cương's son, posted messages on social media to refute the criticism directed at his family, calling the critics "reactionaries" and "saboteurs" and using threatening language. However, public interest in the accident gradually decreased afterward, with the Vietnamese press and authorities ceasing updates about the investigation progress or the identity of the accused driver.

=== 2026 ===
==== Renewed public interest ====
On 8 April 2026, Lâm Thị Phương Thanh, Cương's wife, was appointed Minister of Culture, Sports and Tourism (MCST). In early August 2026, after lyrics from Vietnamese singer MCK's album HVL was ordered to be removed by the Ho Chi Minh City's Department of Culture and Sports for containing "sensitive content", information related to Thanh's family gained renewed attention. Some opinions suggested this accident was the catalyst for the resurgence; however, BBC News Vietnamese argued it stemmed from multiple reasons, including increased control over citizens' opinions on social media prior to the accident. Meanwhile, on Threads and Reddit, many young people expressed societal grievances regarding issues such as land confiscation in Hanoi, construction at Hải Vân Pass, the death of a female student in Vĩnh Long, and the recent cheating scandal in the 2026 High School Graduation Examination in Tuyên Quang.

Keywords and hashtags such as "Nguyễn Sỹ Cương", #BMW, "BMW NSC", "gốc cây số 55" (lit. 'tree number 55'), "30H-369.09", as well as accusations related to Cương at one point reached the Trending tab on Threads, with over a million related posts. A CCTV video from a nearby property, images and videos from bypassers and witnesses, and discussions also spread to many other platforms such as VOZ, Reddit, Facebook, TikTok, and YouTube, featuring a surge of satirical content about the accident in the form of poems and comics. On Google Maps, the location of the accident was briefly marked by users with the names "BMW NSC 30525 Tree" and "Justice Tree" before being quickly deleted afterwards. Additionally, the accident's details were translated into multiple languages to further inform the international community. A boycott against Phúc, Cương's son, was also called.

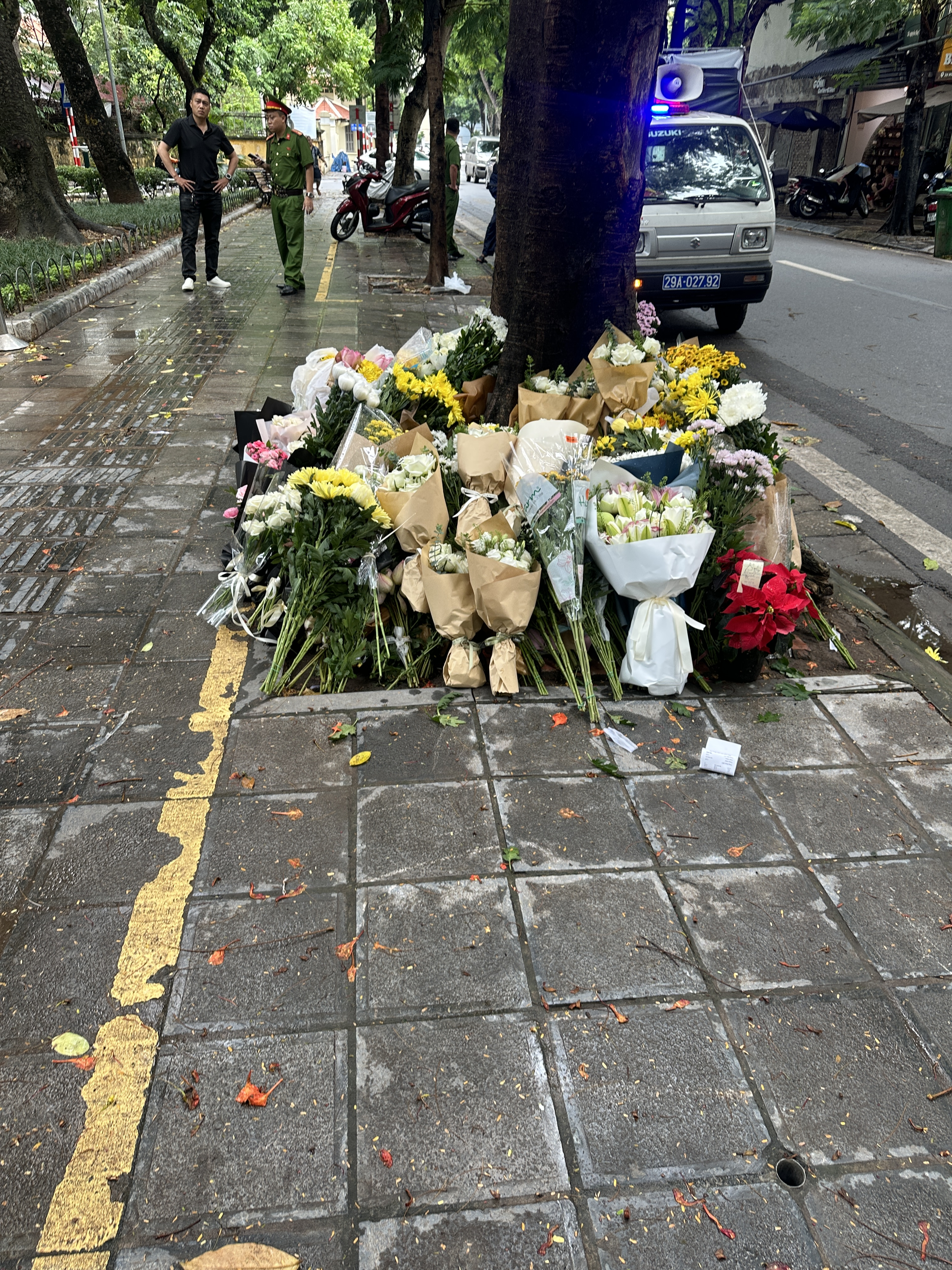
Police forces standing guard near memorial bouquets placed by citizens around the tree at the accident scene, a year after the event.

==== Censorship ====
Afterwards, social media posts related to the accident were reportedly restricted from being displayed in Vietnam at the request of the Ministry of Culture, Sports and Tourism and subsequently the Ministry of Public Security, while Meta did not respond to a request for comment from AFP about the removal of Threads posts. By 13 August, calls on social networks to check in or lay memorial flowers at the base of tree number 55 on Nguyễn Huy Tự Street, where the accident occurred, were noted and succeeded; however, by 14 August, authorities cleared the memorabilia and stationed local civil defence officials around the tree. Following the suppression of the wave of tributes at the accident site, calls appeared on Threads to tie white bows on backpacks in memory of the victim.

== Response ==
=== Public reactions ===
Immediately after the report on Thời sự, the official response from the authoriities generated overwhelmingly negative reactions, particularly on social media, for not addressing the reason for the case file being withheld well beyond the specified 20-day timeframe given by the law, the perpetrator's identity not being revealed for more than a year, and not explaining why a blood alcohol test was not conducted on Cương immediately after the accident, but rather the day after, with another 4-day period before results were returned to investigative agencies.

Footage from the report also featured official documents without accent marks - such as "giao thong" (giao thông) - and typos - such as "AloSense" (AlcoSense), framed the author of a post on Threads asking for justice as a "terrorist", and did not elaborate on whether Clause 3, Article 2 of the Code was appropriate for the case, considering that CCTV footage of the crash corroborated by eyewitnesses showed Cương fleeing the scene with an unidentified woman in a black dress. Whether the appearance of Đỗ Việt Hùng, Đỗ Ngọc Phương Thùy's father, after having suffered serious injuries and lost his daughter as direct consequences of the accident on the report is appropriate, vis-a-vis Nguyễn Sỹ Cương's absence, is contended, with calls for him and the Minister of Public Security to "set the record straight".

There were also concerns that Cương’s exemption could potentially set a dangerous legal precedent and undermine the equal application of the law in similar cases, in which a commentator questioned whether the decision from authorities meant that, from now on, a driver with a valid licence who has not been drinking could recklessly speed, change lanes illegally, run red lights and cause a fatal crash, then simply settle the matter through financial compensation and walk away without criminal liability.

State-sponsored media afterwards used the crash and case file presented by the report to attempt to shape public opinion against "terrorist organisations" and "reactionary forces" "pushing" Gen Z, particularly university students, into "conducting colour revolutions", instead of consoling the victims.

Despite its failure to gain professional and transparent answers from the authorities, the sustained social media campaign spurred by this accident marks a significant development, demonstrating the growing ability of Gen Z-led social media movements to bring issues to national attention and prompt a government response. Trần Đại Lâm, a Hanoi-based lawyer from ANVI Law Firm, said the issue would not simply disappear from public attention while unanswered questions remained, even if mainstream media coverage fades, while Nguyễn Hoàng Vi said the crash had challenged her previously skeptical perception of Gen Z, noting that the victim’s (Thùy) age had fostered strong empathy among young people, highlighting how younger generations engage with social issues differently from their predecessors. "Perhaps that year-long silence became the breaking point for their patience. Young people no longer want to simply hear adults say, ‘Trust in justice’; they want to see justice actually served.”, she added.

== See also ==
- Li Gang accident
- 2026 Chinatown car accident
