= 2024 in Vietnam =

- Decades: 2000s; 2010s; 2020s
- See also: Other events of 2024; History of Vietnam; Timeline of Vietnamese history; List of years in Vietnam

Events in the year 2024 in Vietnam.

== Incumbents ==
- General Secretary of the Communist Party of Vietnam – Nguyễn Phú Trọng (until 18 July); Tô Lâm (since 3 August)
- President of Vietnam – Võ Văn Thưởng (until 21 March); Võ Thị Ánh Xuân (acting, 21 March-22 May); Tô Lâm (since 22 May- 21 October), Lương Cường (since 21 October)
- Prime Minister of Vietnam – Phạm Minh Chính
- Chairman of the National Assembly – Vương Đình Huệ (until 2 May); Trần Thanh Mẫn (since 20 May)

== Events ==
=== March ===
- 21 March – Vietnamese anti-corruption campaign: President Võ Văn Thưởng resigns after just over a year in office amid the Communist Party's anti-corruption campaign, making him the shortest-serving president in Vietnamese history.

=== April ===
- 11 April – A court sentences tycoon Trương Mỹ Lan to death over a $12.46 billion financial fraud case.
- 17 April – Vietnam mounts a $24 billion rescue for the Sai Gon Joint Stock Commercial Bank, which is currently involved in a massive fraud case.
- 26 April – Vương Đình Huệ resigns as chairman of the National Assembly of Vietnam.

=== May ===
- 16 May – Permanent Member of the Communist Party of Vietnam Central Committee's Secretariat Trương Thị Mai resigns after just over a year in office amid the Communist Party's anti-corruption campaign.
- 22 May – Public Security Minister Tô Lâm is selected as president by the National Assembly.
- 24 May – Fourteen people are killed and three are injured by a building fire in a densely populated area of Hanoi.

=== June ===
- 8–10 June – At least three people are killed during floods in the north of the country.
- 19 June – The government announces the resignation of Dinh Tien Dung as the head of the Communist Party of Vietnam in Hanoi.

=== July ===
- 18 July – President Tô Lâm is installed as the General Secretary of the Communist Party of Vietnam on a caretaker basis after Nguyễn Phú Trọng falls ill.
- 19 July – Nguyễn Phú Trọng dies in a military hospital in Hanoi "after a period of illness".

=== August ===
- 3 August – President Tô Lâm is installed as the General Secretary of the Communist Party of Vietnam on an official basis.
- 5 August – Billionaire Trinh Van Quyet is convicted by a court in Hanoi of fraud involving the overstating of the value of a subsidiary of his FLC Group by $150 million and is sentenced to 21 years' imprisonment. Two of his sisters as well as former Ho Chi Minh City Stock Exchange chair Tran Dac Sinh and two others are also sentenced on related charges.

=== September ===
- 7–12 September – At least 199 people are killed and at least 800 others are injured after Typhoon Yagi makes landfall in the Quảng Ninh-Haiphong area.
- 10 September – At least 48 people are killed and 39 others are reported missing in a landslide that buries the village of Lang Nu in Lào Cai province.
- 29 September – Ten crew aboard a Vietnamese fishing boat are injured in an attack by an unidentified vessel near the disputed Paracel Islands in the South China Sea claimed by Vietnam, China and Taiwan. Vietnamese authorities subsequently accuse Chinese law enforcement officers of responsibility.
- 30 September – A court in Thailand orders the extradition of Y Quynh Bđăp, a Montagnard activist convicted in absentia in Vietnam of terrorism charges over his role in the 2023 Đắk Lắk attacks.

=== October ===
- 2–3 October – Authorities confirm an outbreak of H5N1 avian influenza affecting tigers and other big cats fed with infected poultry following tests on deceased subjects from zoos in Đồng Nai and Long An provinces.
- 17 October – Trương Mỹ Lan is sentenced to life imprisonment in a fraud case.
- 21 October – Army general Lương Cường is selected as president by the National Assembly.

=== November ===
- 12 November – Huỳnh Thị Thanh Thủy becomes the first person from Vietnam to win the Miss International beauty pageant.
- 30 November – The National Assembly approves construction of the North–South express railway linking Hanoi and Ho Chi Minh City.

=== December ===
- 4 December – Twelve soldiers are killed in an explosion caused by lightning hitting detonators in Đồng Nai province.
- 5 December – Chinese online retailer Temu is suspended in Vietnam for failing to register with the country's government.
- 18 December – Eleven people are killed in a suspected arson attack on a cafe in Hanoi.
- 22 December – The Ho Chi Minh City Metro begins operations.
- 25 December – A law requiring social media companies to store and submit user data to authorities on request and remove "illegal" content within 24 hours comes into effect.

== Holidays ==
- 1–2 January – New Year's Day
- 10–15 February – Vietnamese New Year
- 18 April – Hung Kings Commemoration Day
- 10 April – Hari Raya Puasa
- 30 April – Reunification Day
- 1 May – Labour Day
- 2 September – National Day

== Deaths ==
- 19 July – Nguyen Phu Trong, 8th Leader of Vietnam (b. 1944).

== Art and entertainment ==
- List of 2024 box office number-one films in Vietnam
- List of Vietnamese submissions for the Academy Award for Best International Feature Film
- List of VTV dramas broadcast in 2024
