= 2020 in Vietnam =

- Decades: 2000s; 2010s; 2020s
- See also: Other events of 2020; History of Vietnam; Timeline of Vietnamese history; List of years in Vietnam

Events in the year 2020 in Vietnam.

== Incumbents ==
- Party General Secretary & President: Nguyễn Phú Trọng
- Vice President: Đặng Thị Ngọc Thịnh
- Prime Minister: Nguyễn Xuân Phúc
- Assembly Chairperson: Nguyễn Thị Kim Ngân

== Events ==
- First part of the year: Mekong Delta drought
- 16 October – 2020 Central Vietnam floods: the floods and landslides in the Central Vietnam cause 111 deaths and 22 missing and more than 250,000 houses are flooded.
- 20 December – VinFuture Prize

== Deaths ==
- 4 January – Nguyễn Chánh Tín, 67, Vietnamese actor (Cards on the Table).
- 4 February – Nguyễn Văn Chiếu, 70, Vietnamese martial artist, master of Vovinam.
