= Nguyễn Lộc =

Vietnamese martial artist and teacher

Nguyễn Lộc 阮祿
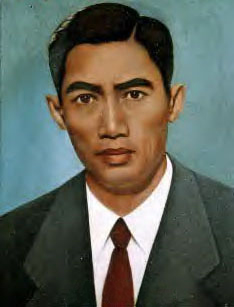
- Portrait photo of Nguyễn Lộc
- Born: Nguyễn Lộc; April 8, 1912; Hữu Bằng village, Thạch Thất, French Indochina
- Died: April 29, 1960 (aged 47); Saigon, South Vietnam
- Nationality: Vietnamese
- Style: Vovinam
- Rank: Founder

Other information
- Occupation: martial artist, teacher
- Notable students: Lê Sáng
- Last updated on: 12 June 2026

Nguyễn Lộc, (chữ Hán: 阮祿, Thạch Thất district, 8 April 1912 – 29 April 1960) was a Vietnamese martial artist and teacher. He was the founder of Vovinam (Việt Võ Đạo).

Grandmaster Nguyễn was born in Hữu Bằng village, Thạch Thất district, then part of Sơn Tây province, now a district of Hanoi. He was the eldest son of Nguyễn Dinh Xuyen (阮廷釧) and Nguyễn Thị Hoa (阮氏和) and had four other siblings; Nguyen Thi Thai (阮氏泰), Nguyen Dan (阮寅), Nguyen Ngo (阮海), and Nguyen Thi Bich Ha (阮氏碧河). His father's family had settled in Hữu Bằng village for many generations. Later on, the family would move to Hanoi where his father would meet an old master and ask the old master to teach his oldest son; young Grandmaster Nguyễn, traditional martial arts and wrestling techniques for his son's health & his ability to defend himself. It was from there he had his first experience with martial arts.

In his younger years he trained in traditional Vietnamese martial arts. In 1938, grandmaster Nguyễn who was already teaching the style to a few of his friends introduced his style "Vovinam" to the public. After a demonstration in 1939 in Hanoi, Vovinam quickly spread across the country, and internationally to the Vietnamese diaspora via France. He taught his first Vovinam lesson in the spring of 1940 at the Hanoi National University of Education (E’cole Normal) however the French banned the movement in 1942.

In 1946 when Vietnam became officially at war with the French, Nguyễn organised his students in resistance in the Hanoi area, but a disagreement with the Viet Minh led to him disbanding his group and retreating to his home village. After much consideration, he decided to emigrated to South Vietnam in the 1954.

July 1954, he and many of his loyal disciples decided to settle in Saigon and start a new life there. It was a time of uncertainty; he had left everything he created in the north and had to start new all over again. However, his business did pick up and he was able to open various Vovinam schools all over the south. Because of the reputation he and his school was quickly able to garner, that same year grandmaster Nguyễn was invited to Thủ Đức, Saigon to train the South Vietnam Police. However, his success was short lived because that summer, he would fall ill and delegate all of Vovinam teaching activities to his senior student Lê Sáng while receding himself to behind the scenes work. He would eventually succumb to his illness in 1960.

After grandmaster Nguyễn's death, his senior student, Grandmaster Lê Sáng continued the development and international promotion of Vovinam until his own death on September 27, 2010.
