= Spring Street =

Spring Street may refer to:

- Spring Street (Los Angeles), USA
- Spring Street (Manhattan), New York City, USA
- Spring Street, Melbourne, Australia
- Spring Street, Singapore
- Spring St (website), a US based lifestyle website

== Subway and trolley stations ==
- Spring Street (IND Eighth Avenue Line) at Sixth Avenue; serving the A, C, and E trains, New York City
- Spring Street (IRT Lexington Avenue Line) at Lafayette Street; serving the 4, 6, and <6> trains, New York City
- Spring Street (San Diego Trolley station), California

== See also ==
- Spring Street Financial District, Los Angeles, California
- Spring Street Academy, Nova Scotia, Canada
- Spring Street Freight House, Jeffersonville, Indiana
