= Quang Trung Campaign =

Quang Trung Campaign may refer to:

- Ha Nam Ninh campaign, also known as the Quang Trung Campaign (1951)
- Quang Trung Campaign (2025–2026)
