= Lê Sáng =

Le Sang 黎桑
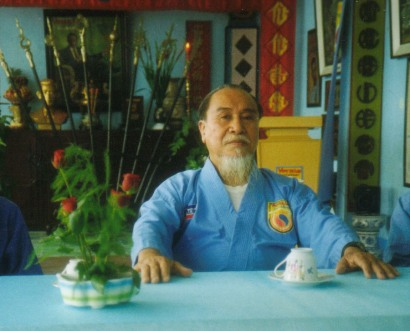
- Grand Master Le Sang
- Born: 1920; Hanoi, French Vietnam, part of French Indochina
- Died: September 27, 2010; Ho Chi Minh City, Vietnam
- Style: Vovinam
- Teacher: Nguyễn Lộc
- Rank: whitebelt in vovinam Grandmaster

Other information
- Occupation: Martial artist
- Notable students: Nguyễn Văn Chiếu

Lê Sáng (chữ Hán: 黎桑, 1920 – September 27, 2010) was the Chairman of the Vovinam Vietnamese Martial Arts World Federation, a position he held from 1960 until his death.

== Biography ==
Le Sang was born to Le Van Hien (also known as Duc Quang) (1887–1959) and Nguyen Thi Mui (1887–1993). He was sickly as a child, which made it difficult for him to walk. His mother advised him to study martial arts in order to strengthen his legs.

In Hanoi he learned Vovinam at Nguyễn Lộc's Vovinam school. Soon Le Sang was a teacher himself and, together with Nguyễn Lộc, continued to develop Vovinam.

In 1954, Le Sang accompanied Nguyễn Lộc to Saigon to open a Vovinam school. He opened additional Vovinam schools, and as of 2007, was still teaching the higher-ranked students.

In 1960, Nguyễn Lộc passed the leadership of Vovinam to Le Sang. Founding Grandmaster Nguyễn's passing couldn't have come at a worse time, because later that year a coup attempt occurred in November led by Lieutenant general Nguyễn Chánh Thi. In the coup, Judo master by the name of Pham Loi was implicated in his involvement in the coup. The news of a martial artist being involved in a coup to topple the government caused the Diem government to be suspicious of the martial arts organizations in the country and many of the martial arts including Vovinam was prohibited. However, after the success of the 1963 coup and the coming to power of the military junta came to power, the ban on martial arts was annulled.

In 1964, Le and the other Vovinam masters under him met together. It was then that the term Việt Võ Đạo (越武道) was coined, and the art was known as Võ Việt Nam - Việt Võ Đạo

After the fall of Saigon he spent several periods in prison until 1988. Leadership passed to Trần Huy Phong (1938–1997).

== See also ==
- Vovinam
- Nguyễn Lộc
- Nguyễn Văn Chiếu
