= 2021 in Vietnam =

- Decades: 2000s; 2010s; 2020s
- See also: Other events of 2021; History of Vietnam; Timeline of Vietnamese history; List of years in Vietnam

Events in the year 2021 in Vietnam.

== Incumbents ==
- Communist Party General Secretary: Nguyễn Phú Trọng
- President: Nguyễn Phú Trọng → Nguyễn Xuân Phúc
- Prime Minister: Nguyễn Xuân Phúc → Phạm Minh Chính
- Assembly Chairperson: Nguyễn Thị Kim Ngân → Vương Đình Huệ

== Events ==
=== Ongoing ===
- COVID-19 pandemic in Vietnam

=== January ===
- 31 January – Nguyễn Phú Trọng is re-elected as General Secretary of the Communist Party of Vietnam for a third five-year term of top leader in Vietnam.

=== May ===
- 23 May – 2021 Vietnamese legislative election

=== July ===
- 8 July – Officials decided to postpone 2021 SEA Games to 2022 due to the ongoing COVID-19 pandemic in Vietnam.
- 23 July – 2 August – Vietnam at the 2020 Summer Olympics

=== August ===
- 24 August – 5 September – Vietnam at the 2020 Summer Paralympics

== Deaths ==
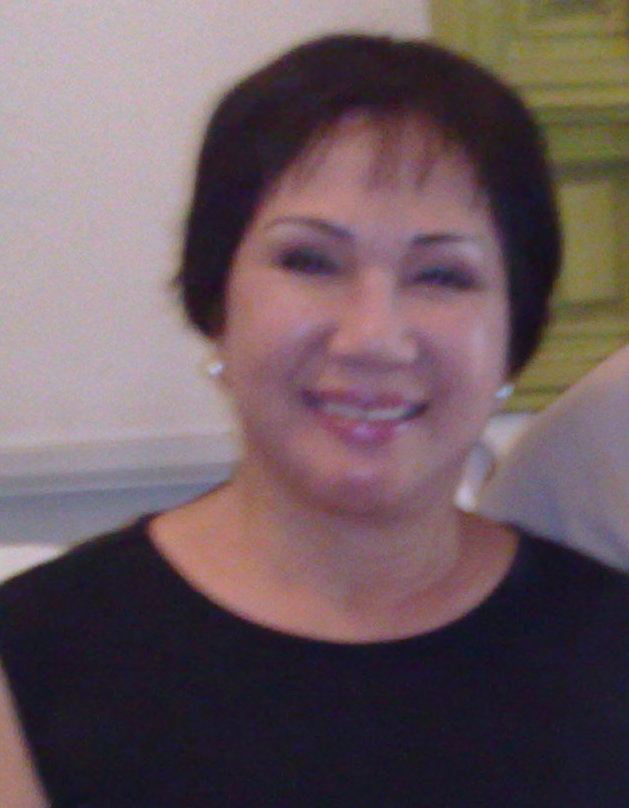
Lệ Thu

- 15 January – Lệ Thu, singer (born 1943).
- 14 February – Nguyễn Tài Thu, physician (born 1931).
