= 2020 Mekong Delta drought =

Drought in Vietnam

Vietnam's Mekong Delta region, which produces more than half the country's rice, endures a prolonged lack of rain combined with saltwater intrusion in early 2020. Five provinces have declared an emergency after drought surpassed the record level of year 2016. Vietnam National Television reported on March a total of 33,000 hectares of rice fields damaged and nearly 70,000 households suffer from lack of water. The drought is attributed to a lack of rain, combined with increase water consumption and storage of water in upstream dams, such as the controversial Xayaburi Dam in Laos.

The drought, along with panic buying by the COVID-19 pandemic, hikes global rice price to a 6-year-high surge.
