= Nguyễn Văn Chiếu =

Vietnamese martial artist (1949–2020)

Peter Nguyễn Văn Chiếu 阮文釗
- Born: 4 November 1949; Saigon, State of Vietnam
- Died: 4 February 2020 (aged 70); Ho Chi Minh City, Vietnam
- Style: Vovinam
- Teacher: Lê Sáng
- Rank: Grandmaster in vovinam

Peter Nguyễn Văn Chiếu (chữ Hán: 阮文釗 4 November 1949 – 4 February 2020) was a Vietnamese grand master of martial arts. He was the Chief of the Vovinam Council from 27 September 2015 until his death.

== Biography ==
Nguyễn Văn Chiếu was born on 4 November 1949 in Saigon. His father was Nguyễn Văn Ba (1926-2014).

He started practicing Vovinam under the guidance of Master Lê Sáng in 1965, when he was 16 years old. In 1967, after three years of hard practice, he earned his 3-dan black belt.

In 1969, Chiếu started to teach Vovinam at Quy Nhơn city in Bình Định province. Bình Định is the homeland of traditional martial arts of Vietnam. Because many masters in Bình Định supported him, after five years, Nguyễn Văn Chiếu opened twelve dojos. He trained many students such as future masters Đinh Văn Hòa, Trương Quang Bính, Đỗ Thị Ngọc Long, and Nguyễn Thị Lạc.

In 1975, he left Quy Nhơn and returned to Saigon, working in the sports department of District 8. At the end of 1976, he tried to persuade the government to allow him to teach Vovinam.

On 4 February 2020, Chiếu died in Ho Chi Minh City.

== Family ==
Chiếu, a Christian, was married and had one son and one daughter. His son is Nguyễn Bình Định (b. 1982) and is a 3-dan yellow belt in Vovinam who works in Department of Sports of Ho Chi Minh City as of 2011. His daughter is Thanh Nhã Berrier (née Nguyễn). She is a French national and is married to Frenchman François Berrier.
