= Vietnamese two-child policy =

Former government policy in Vietnam

Vietnam had a population policy in some form for over 60 years, between 1963 and 2025. It was originally launched by the communist government in North Vietnam in the early 1960s and continued throughout the country in modified forms even after the establishment of the Socialist Republic of Vietnam in 1976. The policy historically emphasized an official family-size goal of một hoặc hai con, which means "one or two children."

In 2014, Vietnam had an estimated population of 92.5 million people, which represented 1.28% of the total world population. As of 2020, the total fertility rate of Vietnam was approximately 2.0, close to the replacement-level fertility of 2.1, the rate "at which a population exactly replaces itself from one generation to the next" according to the World Resources Institute.

In 2025, due to a sub-replacement fertility rate, the communist government lifted all regulations regarding the number of children families are allowed to have.

== History ==
From 1954 to 1975, Vietnam was split into North and South Vietnam along the 17th parallel with separate governments and policies in each region. North Vietnam became the Democratic Republic of Vietnam and had a communist government, whereas South Vietnam became the Republic of Vietnam and was more aligned with the United States and other Western nations. In 1963, North Vietnam began a policy advocating a two-child norm due to the sharp population increase of the largely poor and rural population. Vietnam's family planning policy was developed before those of other countries, such as China. The government used a system of information, education, communication (IEC) campaign and publicly accessible contraceptives to curb the population. After the reunification of North and South Vietnam in 1975 under the Communist Party of Vietnam, there was a governmental effort to extend the policies of the North to the rest of Vietnam, which extended into the next decade. Though the government of the Republic of Vietnam adopted family planning in general as the official state policy, inadequate medical facilities prevented the policy from being effectively implemented.

In 1982, the Vietnam government practiced various family planning measures, including the allowance of use of abortion and the creation of the National Committee for Population and Family Planning. After 1983, each family was required to limit the number of children to two. In 1985, the government increased incentives, such as contraceptives and abortion acceptors, and disincentives, such as penalties for violations in family planning.

In 1986, the Party implemented the Renovation (Đổi Mới) Policy, which completely reversed the Communist Party economy to implement capitalistic market ideals. The aims of the Renovation Policy were to end Vietnam's economic isolation, increase competitiveness, and raise living standards. In an attempt to effectively develop the population socioeconomically and increase the standard of living within the population, the Vietnam government emphasized the need to contain birth rates. In 1988, the Council of Ministers issued an in-depth family planning policy, adding additional restrictions beyond the previous restriction of keeping the maximum number of children per household to two. The detailed one-or-two-child policy of Vietnam was established nine years after China's one-child policy was implemented, and elements of China's policy are reflected in Vietnam's, such as the emphasis on marrying later, postponing childbearing age (22-years of age or older for women and 24-years of age or older for men), and spacing out birth of children (3–5 years apart). The state was required to supply free birth control devices (such as intrauterine loops, condoms, and birth control pills) and to provide facilities for individuals who are eligible for abortions. Furthermore, if families did not comply with the two-child policy, they were required to pay high fees and were unable to move into urban centers.

In 1993, the Vietnamese government issued the first formalization for the unified Vietnam of the one-to-two child policy as a mandatory national policy. The policy combined advertisements and education to promote a smaller family "so people may enjoy a plentiful and happy life." The Vietnamese government explicitly linked the family planning policy with "historical and cultural traditions, value structures and development objectives," encouraging a collectivist mindset in which individuals honor the needs of the nation above their own. The goal of the policy was to reduce the Vietnamese fertility rate to the replacement level of 2.1 by 2015, so that the country could have a stable population in the mid-21st century. In 1997, the goal was accelerated to reach the replacement level by 2005, and the government subsequently integrated an increased use of abortion as a means to curb population growth.

In 2003, the Standing Parliamentary Committee of the National Assembly issued the highest legislative document on population titled the Population Ordinance, which restructured the official family planning policy. According to the ordinance, couples "shall have the right to decide on the time to have babies, the number of children and the duration between child births." However, shortly after, the government implemented the National Strategy on Population 2001–2010, which again called for decreasing the fertility rate to the replacement level by 2005. This caused controversy as individuals protested the conflicting messages purported by the government in regards to their reproductive rights. To address this confusion, the government issued Resolution 47 in 2005 which stated that "to sustain high economic growth, Viet Nam needs to pursue a population control policy until it has become an industrialized country." However at this time, the population had already reached the goal of having a total fertility rate below the replacement level.

In 2009, the Population Ordinance was amended to again restrict the number of children to be one or two children, although individuals were allowed to decide the timing and spacing of their births. The government was a new Law on Population to replace the Population Ordinance in 2015. However, there was disagreement between policy makers and academics on what should be included in the law.

The revised 2009 Population Ordinance which stated that "each couple and individual has the right and responsibility to participate in the campaigns on population and family planning, reproductive health care: (i) decide time and birth spacing; (ii) have one or two children, exceptional cases to be determined by the Government." Thus, individuals had control over the timing and spacing of the births of their children but were still restricted in the number of children they were allowed to have. Later that year, President Trương Tấn Sang stressed the need for continued diligence in population control and stated that the population of Vietnam should be 100 million people by 2020, and suggested that a new comprehensive Law on Population be introduced to the government by 2015.

In 2025, due to a below replacement birth rate, the communist government lifted all regulations regarding the number of children families are allowed to have.

== Administration ==
The organizational structure of the two-child policy was housed under different governmental units since its conception in the 1960s. As the policy evolved from "Initiation in the 1960s–1970s; Maturity in the 1980s–1990s; and Legalization in the 2000s–2010s", the administration of the population policy also changed. From 1961 to 1983, the population program fell under the Population and Birth Control Unit. From 1984 to 2002, it was under the control of National Committee for Population and Family Planning. From 2003 to 2006, it was in the jurisdiction of the Vietnam Commission for Population, Family and Children. Since 2007, the population program has been under the General Office for Population and Family Planning.

Although the policy was advocated on the national level, the central government did not utilize specific fines or incentives, instead delegating implementation responsibilities to local governments. Each family was required to have at most two children, and local governments were responsible to decide the details of enforcement. Depending on the specific location, district governments charged fines ranging from 60 to 800 kilograms of paddy rice, equivalent to the worth of a month to a year's wages, for each additional child, and additionally, women who agreed to be sterilized were given bonuses of 120 to 400 kilograms (260 to 880 lb) of rice. Individuals who did not use contraceptives sometimes had their names announced over the intercom system of the village to shame them into using them, whereas individuals who did could be selected to win the Labor Medal for "good realization of the population – family planning program". The government and large companies also regularly denied people who violated the policy of salaries, promotions, and sometimes their jobs.

== Effects ==
=== Reduction of the birthrate ===
The total fertility rate in Vietnam dropped from 5.6 in 1979 to 3.2 by 1993, suggesting the two-child policy was successful in containing the population growth. According to one demographic model, the Bongaarts' model of components of fertility, high rates of contraceptive use and of induced abortion are plausible explanations for the decreased fertility rate. Furthermore, because of this policy, the population has fundamentally changed their ideas of the family. In 1988, the Inter-Censal Demographic and Health Survey found that parents wanted an average of 3.3 children, and in 1994, they found that the ideal number of children fell to 2.8.

However, the reported findings differ depending on the fertility model utilized and on the particular research study cited. The United Nations Economic and Social Council for Asia and the Pacific found that the average number in household was 3.1 in 1998. In another study conducted by the America-based non-profit, non-governmental organization Population Reference Bureau, the number found was lower at 2.3. Another study, published in the Worldwide State of the Family in 1995 by Tran Xuan Nhi, found a contrasting finding that the total fertility rate only dropped slightly and the size of nuclear families experienced only a slight change, dipping from 4.8 to 4.7 from 1989 to 1994.

=== Sex-based differences ===
There is evidence that son preference exists in Vietnam. Traditionally, men oversee and are responsible for household enterprises, managing agriculture, ancestral worship, and carrying on the family name. However, although the desire for a son is seen in the Vietnamese family's fertility practices, the desire for more than one son is not. Families with two daughters are twice as likely to have a third child than families with at least one son, presumably with the hopes that this one will be a boy. Furthermore, women who do not have any sons are around 15% less likely to use contraceptives than families who have at least one. There were also increased rates of "contraceptive failure" amongst couples who had a son, as families secretly removed an IUD to bypass the policy in hopes of having a son. This is consistent with findings from other East Asian countries in which son preference corresponds with a demand for fewer children so that families will have at least one son to maintain the ancestral line.

Despite the evidence for son preference, there is no clear evidence that Vietnam's sex ratio at birth is increasing, as seen in other East Asian countries, notably China, though evidence is conflicting depending on the source. In fact, according to the Vietnamese census data for 1989 and 1999, the sex ratios of males to females at birth are actually decreasing. On the other hand, some sources state that the impact of son preference varies by region of Vietnam. In the north, there is a strong relationship between sex bias in fertility decisions and number of male births, while in the south, this relationship is nonexistent. However, mothers who pursue certain occupations, such as government cadres and farmers, are more likely to want a particular sex of child and have higher sex-ratio differences at birth. This reflects the pressure for government employees to adhere to the two-child limit, and the perceived necessity of males for manual labor in the farm.

== Criticism ==
=== Inadequate contraceptives ===
Although the policy states that "the state will supply, free of charge, birth control devices... to eligible persons who are cadres, manual workers, civil servants or members of the armed forces... and poor persons who register to practice family planning... The widespread sale of birth control devices will be permitted to facilitate their use by everybody that needs them," the only modern contraceptive readily available in Vietnam is the IUD. However, many women choose not to use it due to the side effects, such as increased bleeding, back and abdominal pains, headache, and general weakness. Thus, contraceptive use is low among women under the age of 25, and experts have speculated that "contraceptive use among young women might increase if temporary, easy-to-use methods, such as the pill and the condom, were more accessible. For the government to achieve its two-child policy, the survey committee recommends increased promotion of the commercial availability of the condom and the pill, and strengthening of the government family planning program."

=== Increased abortion rates ===
Abortion rates in Vietnam are unusually high by international standards, with a total abortion rate of at least 2.5 abortions per woman. Generally, the abortion rate for young age groups is higher than older age groups due to a limited awareness of contraceptive methods and availability. Individuals of lower educational levels also have higher abortion rates. Vietnam also has some of the world's most liberal abortion laws, though the Vietnamese government is aiming to reduce the number of unwanted pregnancies and abortion-related difficulties. Although sex-selective abortions were banned by the government in 2006, there is evidence that suggests that son preference is associated with a higher likelihood of repeat abortions, as women with no sons were significantly less likely to have a repeat abortion compared to women with one son.

There are multiple factors influencing Vietnam's high abortion rates. First, because women do not have access to contraceptive methods besides IUDs, whilst condoms remain expensive relative to average income, as a result many do not use effective birth control. Women who have undergone multiple abortions used short-term methods of contraceptives, such as condoms and contraceptive pills, which are less effective than long-acting contraceptives to which many do not have access. Secondly, due to the higher costs of raising a child in some geographic areas of Vietnam, abortions have become more acceptable. Furthermore, the era of modernization and development of free-market reforms since the 1980s has led to a rise in premarital and unwanted pregnancy, and subsequently increased abortion services. Additionally, the Vietnamese government has insufficient alternatives to abortion within the family planning purposes and a lack of post-abortion contraceptive dialogues for families. Thus, experts have suggested providing more diverse, long-acting contraceptive alternatives and increasing counseling for families that have experienced an abortion as methods to decrease abortion in Vietnam.

== See also ==
- Demographics of Vietnam
- One child policy
