= Spring Street, Singapore =

Street in Chinatown, Singapore

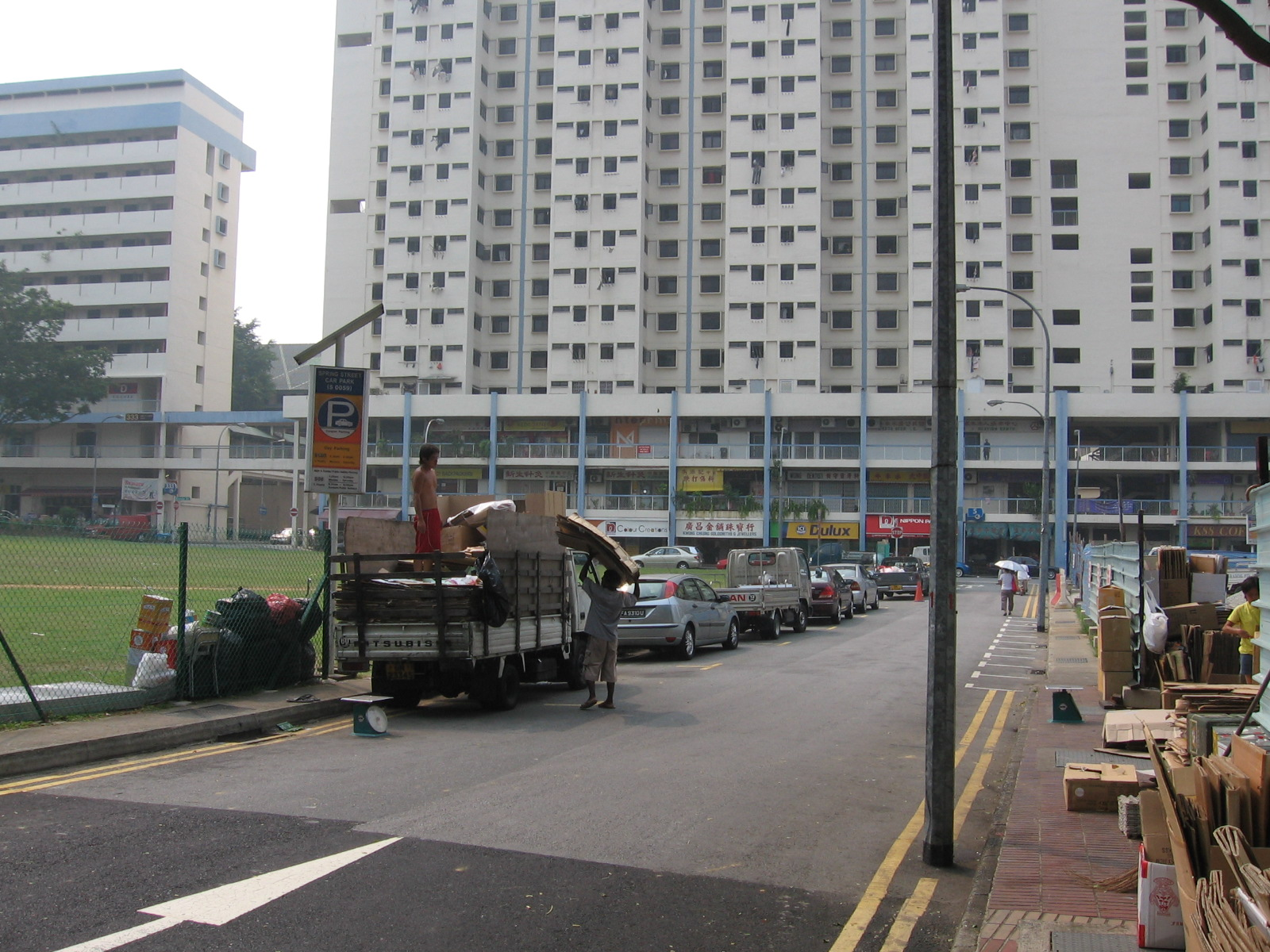
Spring Street in Chinatown, Singapore.

Spring Street (Chinese: 史必灵路) is a one-way street in Chinatown within the Outram Planning Area of Singapore. The street links Neil Road to Banda Street and is mainly used during the Chinese New Year festive season as part of the Chinatown night bazaar.

== See also ==
- 2026 Chinatown car accident
