= 2025 Vietnam floods =

Natural disaster in Vietnam

2025 Vietnam floods 2025 Great Flood
Event Information
- Events: Extreme weather, tropical cyclones, floods, landslides
- Date: September 25 – December 6, 2025
- Affected areas: Northern and Central Vietnam
- Impact: Tropical cyclones: Storm No. 9 (September 25); Storm No. 10 (September 29); Storm No. 11 (October 6); Storm No. 12 (October 23); Storm No. 13 (November 6); Storm No. 15 (December 3); Intertropical Convergence Zone; Easterly wave disturbances Cold fronts
- Economic damage: Approximately 82 trillion VND (as of December 6)

Floods in Vietnam 2025 or The Great Flood of 2025 (as referred to by Vietnamese media) were an exceptionally severe flood event that occurred in Vietnam in late 2025. The two main affected areas were the northern and central provinces of the country.

Starting from 25 September 2025, Vietnam was successively hit by five tropical storms (Nos. 9 to 13): Typhoon Ragasa, Typhoon Bualoi, Typhoon Matmo, Typhoon Fengshen, and Typhoon Kalmaegi, followed by Storm No. 15 (Koto) in early December. These storms made landfall in northern and central Vietnam and, combined with other weather systems such as cold air masses, the tropical convergence zone, and disturbances in the upper-level easterly winds, caused prolonged heavy rainfall over a wide area. Many locations recorded extremely high rainfall totals that broke historical records. The prolonged heavy rain led to flooding on many rivers in northern and central Vietnam, with four out of the country's nine major river systems recording historic flood peaks: the Thái Bình river system, the Mã river system, the Vu Gia–Thu Bồn river system, and the Đà Rằng river system. Severe and widespread flooding occurred in many localities across Vietnam during successive flood waves in each region.

The floods caused heavy loss of life and property in the northern and central provinces of Vietnam, particularly in Thái Nguyên, Bắc Ninh, Cao Bằng, Lạng Sơn, Huế, Đà Nẵng, Gia Lai, Đắk Lắk, Khánh Hòa, and Lâm Đồng. The impacts of the floods also raised issues concerning urban infrastructure planning, the regulatory role of hydropower plants in responding to natural disasters and extreme weather in Vietnam, and the operational capacity of the two-level local government model that had just been implemented in the country during the Administrative reform in Vietnam 2024–2025.

== Background ==
In October 2025, the La Niña phenomenon was confirmed in the central Pacific Ocean and was assessed to be affecting Vietnam, with forecasts from the national meteorological agency indicating that the final months of 2025 would see above-average rainfall.

Before Storm No. 9 (Ragasa) arrived, Vietnam had already experienced several natural disaster events in the early months of the 2025 rainy season. In late May 2025, Hà Tĩnh province recorded a historic rainfall event (for that period of the year), causing severe flooding. In June 2025, the Central Central Region experienced an unusually early out-of-season flood event, with rivers such as the Kiên Giang in Quảng Bình, Thạch Hãn in Quảng Trị, Bồ in Huế, and Vu Gia in Quảng Nam rising from flood alert level 2 to above level 3, causing widespread deep flooding.

In July and August 2025, Typhoon No. 3 and a tropical depression made landfall in the Northern provinces, followed by Typhoons No. 5 and No. 6 which made landfall in the North Central region, causing heavy rainfall and flooding in Northern Vietnam. Typhoon No. 3 (Wipha) struck Hung Yen and Ninh Binh provinces, causing widespread heavy rain across the Northern and North Central regions; on July 22, several observation stations in Ninh Binh, Thanh Hoa, and Nghe An recorded daily rainfall levels that broke historical records for July, such as in Sam Son (Thanh Hoa) reaching 430.5 mm; Quy Chau (Nghe An) reaching 259.1 mm; and Van Ly (Ninh Binh) reaching 207.5 mm. The heavy rain triggered an exceptionally severe flood in the Ban Ve hydropower reservoir basin in Nghe An, which was assessed as a "5,000-year event," with the peak flood discharge into the Ban Ve reservoir reaching 12,800 m^3/s, far exceeding the design flood level of 10,500 m^3/s. On the Ca River, several upstream stations in the mountainous areas of Nghe An recorded historical flood values, including Muong Xen, Tuong Duong, and Con Cuong. One month later, Typhoons No. 5 (Kajiki) and No. 6 (Nongfa) made landfall in Nghe An, Ha Tinh, and Quang Tri, continuing to cause heavy rain in Northern and North Central Vietnam, including a downpour on the morning of August 26 that left Hanoi deeply flooded. In several other areas, exceptionally severe floods were also recorded on the Ngoi Hut and Ngoi Thia rivers, as well as the lower reaches of the Tien and Hau rivers.
