= VOZ (forum) =

Vietnamese technology website

- Website type: Internet forum
- Available in: Vietnamese
- Creator: Bạch Thành Trung
- Parent: Công ty Trách nhiệm hữu hạn Thật Vi Diệu
- Website: voz.vn
- Commercial: Yes
- Registration: Required
- Users: 1.16 million (2025)
- Launched: 2001; 25 years ago
- Current status: Active

VOZ (also known as Vnoczone, vOz, vOzforums, Vietnam Overclockers Zone) is an online forum established in 2001, regarded as one of the largest information technology forums in Vietnam.

== History ==
In late 2001, Bach Thanh Trung began developing an online forum dedicated to computer hardware and overclocking at the address vnoczone.2ya.com. By 2002, the forum moved to a new domain, vnoczone.com, with its discussion section separated as forums.vnoczone.com.

In April 2004, VOZ switched its platform and interface from phpBB to vBulletin, adopting the domain vozforums.com to replace vnoczone.com. The new domain name became the official and widely recognized address of the community.

In early June 2005, due to an unexpected incident, both the homepage and the forum were taken offline. After more than a year of inactivity, the forum resumed operation on July 23, 2006, with vnoczone.com redirected to vozforums.com.

On March 9, 2020, the new address voz.vn officially went live, marking the transition away from the outdated and error-prone vBulletin platform to a faster, simpler, and more customizable system.

In March 2025, the VOZ administration required all active accounts to verify their national ID numbers before the 25th, in compliance with Decree 147. However, users continued to post and comment as usual after the deadline. On March 26 of the same year, VOZ announced a temporary suspension of access for users in Vietnam, though the site remained accessible in the country in the following days.

== Topics ==
Discussions on the forum primarily focus on information technology, with particular emphasis on computer hardware and overclocking.

== Influence ==
Since its launch, VOZ quickly gained popularity not only among those interested in technology but also among users outside its core topics. The subforums f17 (Chuyện trò linh tinh) and f33 (Điểm báo) became the most active sections, despite their discussions being unrelated to the forum’s main focus. Many Vietnamese internet memes and trends also originated from VOZ.

== See also ==
- DCinside
- HardwareZone
