= Ngo Vinh Long =

Vietnamese-American historian (1944–2022)

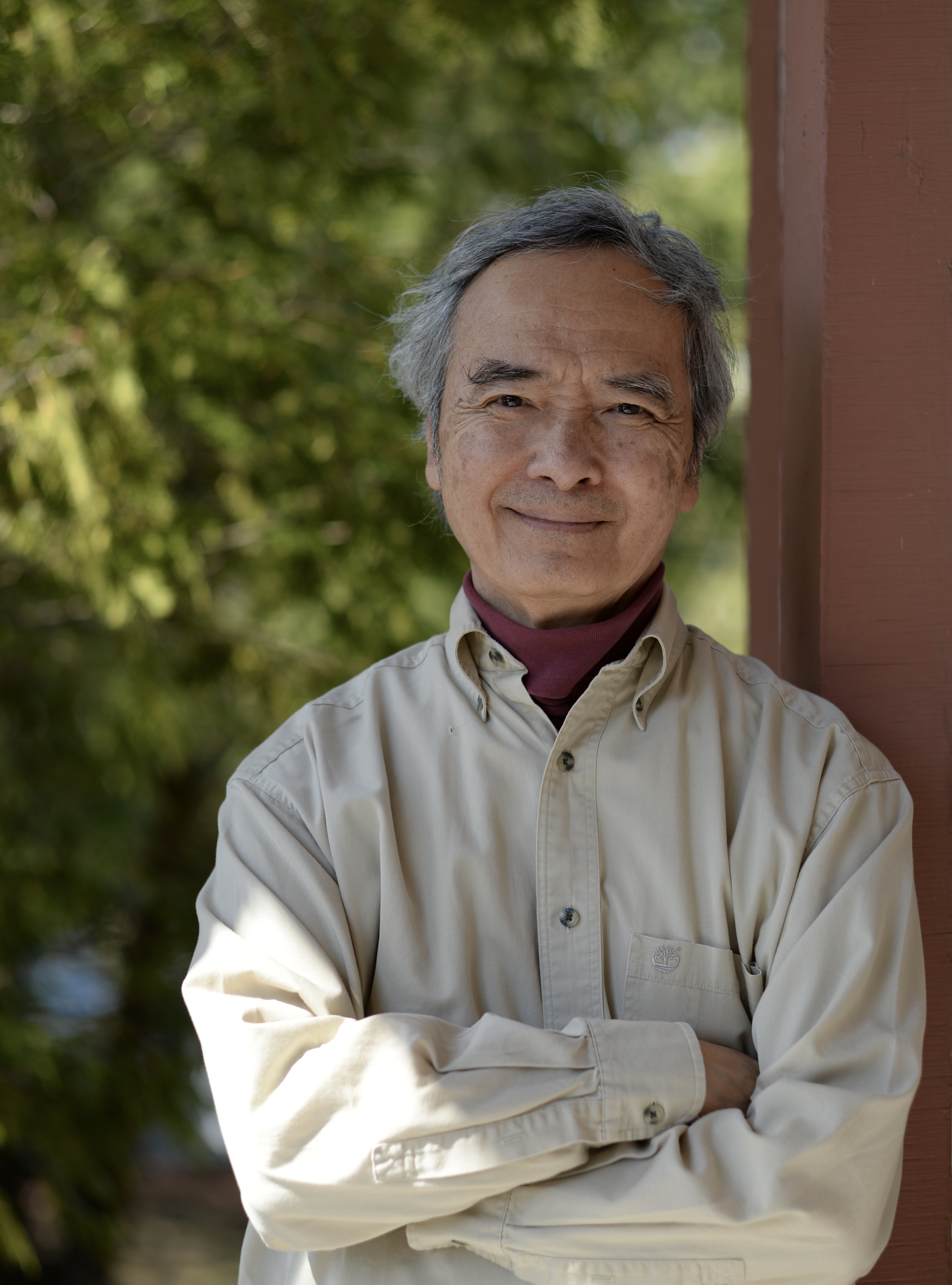
- Long in 2022
- Born: Ngo Vinh Long; April 10, 1944; Vĩnh Long province, Vietnam
- Died: October 12, 2022 (aged 78); Bangor, Maine
- Children: 4

Academic background
- Education: Harvard University (AB, AM, PhD)

Ngô Vĩnh Long (April 10, 1944 – October 12, 2022) was a Vietnamese American historian, a professor of History at the University of Maine from 1985 until his death.

Long was the author of the 1973 book Before the Revolution: The Vietnamese Peasants Under the French.

Long graduated from Harvard University in 1978 and was hired at the University of Maine in the Department of History in 1985. He died after a brief illness on October 12, 2022, at the age of 78.

== Published works ==
- Before the Revolution: The Vietnamese Peasants Under the French 1973 MIT Press
- Coming to Terms: Indochina, the United States and the War 1991 Westview Press, Coauthor Douglas Allen (philosopher)
- Vietnamese Women in Society and Revolution: The French Colonial Period 1974 Vietnam Resource Center, Cambridge, MA
