= Quang Trung Campaign (2025–2026) =

Construction campaign in Vietnam

- Part of Recovery after 2025 floods in Vietnam
- Officers and soldiers of the Vietnam People's Army participate in building houses during the Quang Trung Campaign 2025–2026
- Date: 30 November 2025 – 15 January 2026
- Location: Central Vietnam and Central Highlands
- Also known as: Rapid housing reconstruction campaign in flood-affected areas
- Type: Reconstruction, social welfare, disaster relief
- Theme: “Rapid, bold, decisive victory”
- Cause: Consequences of storms, floods, and landslides at the end of 2025
- Budget: Central budget reserve and socialized sources
- Organised by: Government of Vietnam, Ministry of Defence, Ministry of Public Security
- Participants: 312,000 turns of Army soldiers, 126,000 turns of Public Security forces
- Outcome: 100% completion of new construction and repair of houses before Tết Bính Ngọ
- Property damage: 1,597 houses completely collapsed; 34,759 houses heavily damaged

Quang Trung Campaign (2025–2026) is a special national reconstruction campaign implemented by the Government of Vietnam with the objective of rapidly rebuilding and repairing houses for households affected by natural disasters in the Central and Central Highlands regions.

Inspired by the rapid march of Emperor Quang Trung, the campaign aims to complete the entire workload within 45 days to ensure that residents have sturdy housing before the Binh Ngo Lunar New Year. This is considered one of the largest civil-military campaigns mobilized in peacetime in Vietnam, involving many ministries, sectors, localities, and armed forces. The campaign focuses not only on housing construction but also on ensuring social security and supporting long-term livelihoods for affected residents, including providing construction materials and technical support. According to official reports, the campaign budget is sourced from the central reserve combined with socialized resources, with a total estimated value of trillions of dong, which is allocated flexibly to localities.

== Background and Scale of Damage ==
At the end of 2025, the Central region and the provinces of the Central Highlands had to endure storms, floods, and landslides of historic intensity, causing severe damage to people, property, and infrastructure. According to the damage statistics recorded by the Government, the total number of households requiring housing support reached 36,356 households, including households in provinces such as Gia Lai, Đắk Lắk, Quảng Ngãi, and other provinces. The specific damage included 1,597 houses completely collapsed and 34,759 houses heavily damaged, leading to an urgent need for reconstruction to stabilize people's lives before the next rainy and stormy season. These floods not only caused houses to collapse but also damaged roads, bridges, culverts, affecting transportation and the delivery of construction materials, forcing the campaign to face many terrain challenges. In Quảng Ngãi province, the damage was concentrated in mountainous districts, where landslides caused hundreds of houses to collapse. Similarly, in Đắk Lắk and Gia Lai, areas inhabited by ethnic minorities were heavily affected, with the number of collapsed houses accounting for a high proportion in the overall statistics. Reports from localities show that the damage was not only to housing but also affected agriculture and livestock breeding, requiring comprehensive support.

=== Key Damage Statistics ===
Locality	Houses completely collapsed	Houses damaged	Total
Gia Lai	674	8,420	9,094
Đắk Lắk	610	7,550	8,160
Quảng Ngãi	185	9,800	9,985
Other provinces	128	8,989	9,117
Total	1,597	34,759	36,356

This statistic was compiled from local reports, with Gia Lai and Đắk Lắk accounting for a large proportion due to the high mountainous terrain that is prone to landslides. In Quảng Ngãi province, the damage was mainly caused by flash floods, affecting 9,985 households, many of which were ethnic minority households requiring special support. Other provinces such as Khánh Hòa and Lâm Đồng also recorded similar damage, with damaged houses accounting for the majority. The report from the Quảng Ngãi Department of Agriculture and Environment further indicated that housing damage was accompanied by losses of agricultural land, requiring a comprehensive resettlement plan. The total economic damage from the floods is estimated at thousands of billions of đồng, of which the housing portion accounted for the largest share.

== Implementation ==
The campaign was implemented under the motto “taking the people as the root”, mobilizing the combined strength of the political system with the armed forces playing the core role. The implementation process was divided into phases, from damage assessment to construction and handover, with strict supervision from the central government. In the first week (01/12/2025–06/12/2025), localities such as Quảng Ngãi directed surveys and initiated construction, with the participation of local forces. By the week from 29/12/2025–05/01/2026, repair progress was high, with many houses handed over early. The campaign used online monitoring technology to report daily progress to the Prime Minister. In the Central Highlands provinces, the transportation of materials faced difficulties due to the terrain, but these were overcome thanks to the support of the Public Security and Army forces. The 2026 digital transformation report of Quảng Ngãi also mentioned the integration of digital technology into campaign monitoring, such as using a progress tracking application.

=== Mobilization of Forces ===
The synergy between the military and the people was raised to the highest level throughout the 45 days and nights. The Army forces mobilized more than 312,000 turns of officers and soldiers from units under Military Region 4 and Military Region 5, taking responsibility for new construction in key difficult areas such as Gia Lai and Đắk Lắk. Army units used specialized equipment to transport materials through terrain that had been cut off. The Public Security forces mobilized 126,000 turns of officers and soldiers; in addition to ensuring security, they also participated in transporting materials through terrain severed by landslides, especially in Quảng Ngãi and the Central provinces. In addition to the armed forces, mass organizations such as the Women's Union, Youth Union, and Fatherland Front also participated, with thousands of volunteer turns supporting labor and supervision. In Quảng Ninh, although it was not a main disaster-affected area, there were reports of force support for the campaign through the twinning program. State-owned enterprises such as Petrovietnam participated in sponsoring construction materials, with a value of hundreds of billions of đồng.

=== Technical Standards ===
All works in the campaign must meet strict technical standards adapted to climate change according to Guidance Document No. 3756. The “3-hard” standard: hard foundation, hard frame-walls, hard roof, aimed at improving resistance to major storms and flash floods. (Note: This is the core standard aimed at enhancing the structure's ability to withstand major storms and flash floods.) Supervision was carried out through the daily online reporting system (Real-time monitoring), allowing the Prime Minister to directly monitor progress in each locality. This guidance document was issued along with specific regulations on construction materials, such as the use of reinforced concrete and storm-resistant corrugated iron roofs. In Quảng Ngãi, the works additionally applied flash-flood resistance standards, with house foundations raised at least 1 meter. The 2026 digital transformation report emphasized the use of GIS software to plan safe house construction locations.

== Results ==
By 15 January 2026, the campaign had achieved its goal of “rapid combat, rapid victory”. The repair work was 100% completed (34,759 houses) on 30 December 2025, finishing 15 days ahead of schedule. The new construction work completed the handover of all 1,597 houses, with progress exceeding the plan in many provinces. In Gia Lai, more than 96% was achieved by 15 January, with the remainder completed before 19 January. In Đắk Lắk, 610 houses were fully handed over to ethnic minority households. In Quảng Ngãi, all 185 collapsed houses were newly built, combined with resettlement support for 9,985 affected households. Other provinces such as Lâm Đồng and Khánh Hòa also reported 100% completion, with a total of 128 collapsed houses and 8,989 damaged houses handled promptly. The overall summary of the campaign showed high efficiency, with cost savings thanks to social mobilization and on-site forces.
