= Football at the 2021 SEA Games – Men's tournament final =

Football match at 2021 SEA Games

Gold medal match
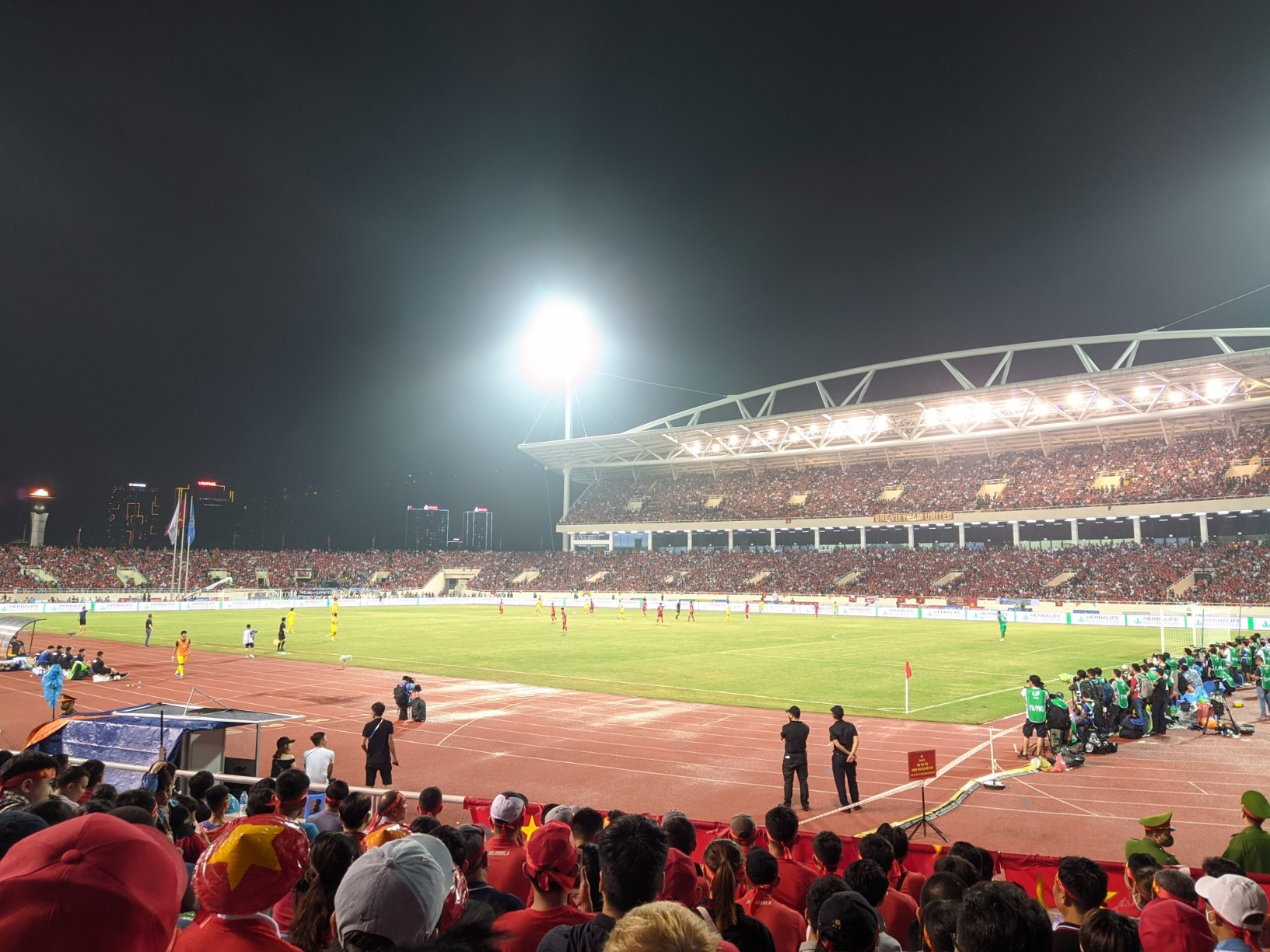
- Mỹ Đình National Stadium in Hanoi during the match.
- Event: Football at the 2021 SEA Games
Vietnam	Thailand
(Vietnam)	(Thailand)
1	0
- Vietnam won the gold medal for the second time.
- Date: 22 May 2022; 4 years ago
- Venue: Mỹ Đình National Stadium, Hanoi
- Man of the Match: Nhâm Mạnh Dũng (Vietnam)
- Referee: Mahmood Al Majarafi (Oman)
- Attendance: 39,898
- Weather: Clear sky 24 °C (75 °F); Humidity 94%

At 19:00 on May 22, 2022 (UTC+07:00), the men's football final match at the 2021 SEA Games between the two U-23 teams, Vietnam and Thailand, took place at My Dinh National Stadium, Hanoi. This was the 23rd final match of men's football at the Southeast Asian Games, one of the competitions of the games, and was also part of the final competition day of the 31st games taking place in Vietnam.

Vietnam won 1–0 by the only goal of Nhâm Mạnh Dũng in the 83rd minute of the match, thereby helping Vietnam win the gold medal in men's football. This is the second time Vietnam won the gold medal in this competition, the first being in 2019. (Note: Previously, the South Vietnamese team had won the gold medal in men's football at the 1959 SEAP Games. After Vietnam was unified in 1975, this medal was considered to belong to the unified Vietnamese team.) All information about the team's victory was reported by Vietnamese state media after the match ended. Many fans took to the streets to celebrate the victory. This is one of the outstanding achievements of Vietnamese football in the first half of 2022, and also the last game where coach Park Hang-seo was involved with Vietnam's U-23 team, because he officially left the team after the 31st congress in Vietnam.

== Background ==
The men's football final at the 31st Southeast Asian Games (SEA Games 31) between Vietnam and Thailand took place in a special context, when the two traditional teams of Southeast Asia met for the first time in a SEA Games final after 17 years, since the last time at the 2003 tournament held at Vietnam's home stadium. The 31st SEA Games will be held in Vietnam in 2022, after being postponed for a year due to the COVID-19 pandemic. Similar to recent games, the men's football tournament is limited to players under 23 years old, allowing each team to add up to three overage players to the registration list. This is a favorable condition for both U23 Vietnam and U23 Thailand to bring out their strongest forces in the goal of winning the prestigious gold medal.

In the history of the SEA Games, the Vietnamese men's football team has faced Thailand four times in the finals in the years 1995, 1999, 2003 and 2005. In all four of these confrontations, the Vietnamese team - at different levels - could not win, thereby accepting the runner-up position against an opponent considered one of the strongest football forces in Southeast Asia. After their last meeting at the 2005 SEA Games final, Thailand continued to show their dominance in the regional arena by winning four more gold medals in the years 2007, 2013, 2015 and 2017. While Vietnam has only won one gold medal at the 30th Games in 2019.

In addition to the final match against Thailand, Vietnam has the potential to set a record for defense. If the team wins without conceding a goal, they will be the first team in SEA Games men's football history to win the gold medal with a clean sheet for the entire tournament since Indonesia in 1991. Malaysia also achieved this in the 1979 SEA Games.

Another notable milestone in the history of the two teams' confrontation was the 1999 SEA Games – the last time that SEA Games men's football did not apply age limits. In that year's tournament, the Vietnamese team reached the final without conceding a goal throughout the journey, but still had to accept a 0–2 defeat to Thailand, thereby continuing to miss out on the gold medal.

== Venue ==
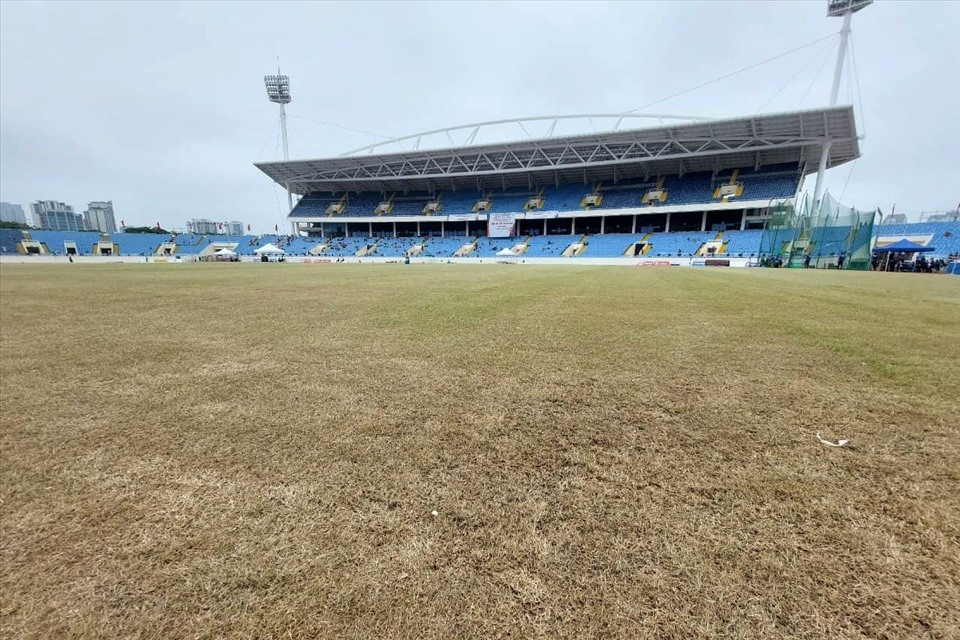
Mỹ Đình Stadium's grass before the men's football final of SEA Games 31.

The final match was held at the Mỹ Đình National Stadium located in Hanoi. This is one of the key sports facilities in Vietnam, inaugurated in 2003 to host the 22nd Games held in the same year - the first games hosted by Vietnam. This is also the home stadium of the Vietnam team when competing in international matches.

In preparation for the organization of the Congress, My Dinh Stadium received 408 billion VND from the State to renovate important items of the stadium, in which the items that are focused on are the grass surface, lighting system, audience seats and some other items. The renovation was carried out from the beginning of December 2021 until the end of January 2022, to organize the match between Vietnam and China in the 2022 FIFA World Cup qualification – AFC third round. Notably, the grass surface of the stadium after the renovation has been greatly improved.

During the 31st congress, My Dinh Stadium hosted the opening ceremony on May 12, 2022, and some athletics events. However, these events had a significant impact on the quality of the competition field when the opening ceremony caused the grass to turn yellow and the organizers had to dismantle the stage after the ceremony to take care of the grass, but due to the influence of the athletics competition, the grass could not reach its best condition, despite being carefully cared for. However, the Asian Football Confederation (AFC) still assessed the grass as qualified to host the match.

== Pre-match ==
=== Route to the final ===
Vietnam		Round	Thailand	
Opponent	Score	Group stage	Opponent	Score
Indonesia	3–0	Match 1	Malaysia	1–2
Philippines	0–0	Match 2	Singapore	5–0
Myanmar	1–0	Match 3	Cambodia	5–0
Timor-Leste	2–0	Match 4	Laos	1–0
First in Group A: Pos / Team / Pld / Pts; 1 / Vietnam (H) / 4 / 10; 2 / Indonesia / 4 / 9; 3 / Myanmar / 4 / 6; 4 / Philippines / 4 / 4; 5 / Timor-Leste / 4 / 0; Source: FIFA (H) Hosts		Final standings	First in Group B: Pos / Team / Pld / Pts; 1 / Thailand / 4 / 9; 2 / Malaysia / 4 / 8; 3 / Singapore / 4 / 5; 4 / Cambodia / 4 / 4; 5 / Laos / 4 / 1; Source: FIFA	
Opponent	Score	Knockout stage	Opponent	Score
Malaysia	1–0 (a.e.t.)	Semi-final	Indonesia	1–0 (a.e.t.)

==== Vietnam ====
Vietnam began their campaign with an opening match against Indonesia, the opponent they defeated in the semi-finals of the 2017 SEA Games. The match took place at Việt Trì Stadium (Phu Tho), which became the team's official home ground throughout the group stage. Vietnam won an impressive 3–0 with goals from Nguyễn Tiến Linh, Đỗ Hùng Dũng and Lê Văn Đô, thereby creating favorable psychological momentum for the rest of the group.

In the second match, the team faced Philippines in a difficult match. Despite controlling most of the match, Vietnam U23 could not score and accepted a 0–0 draw – also the only match in which the team did not score in the entire tournament. The team then defeated Myanmar with a score of 1–0 and Timor Leste with a score of 2–0, thereby winning the top spot in Group A with an unbeaten record: 3 wins, 1 draw, and no goals conceded.

In the semi-finals, Vietnam faced Malaysia – the second-placed team in Group B. The match was tight and there were no goals in the official 90 minutes of play. It was not until extra time that striker Nguyễn Tiến Linh scored the only goal in the 111th minute, bringing Vietnam to the final with an impressive record: not conceding any goals and winning both important matches with a pragmatic and solid playing style.

==== Thailand ====
Thailand were drawn in Group B alongside Malaysia, Cambodia, Singapore and Laos. The team was managed by Alexandré Pölking – who was also the head coach of the Thailand national team – and fielded a squad that featured a mix of promising young talent and three players over the age of 23: Jonathan Khemdee, Weerathep Pomphan and Worachit Kanitsribampen.

Thailand had a bad start when they lost 1–2 to Malaysia in the opening match, in a match where they let their opponents come back in the second half. However, the Thai team quickly regained their form in the remaining three group stage matches. They defeated Singapore 5–0, Cambodia 5–0 and Laos 1–0. With three consecutive victories and a superior goal difference, Thailand took the top spot in Group B, surpassing Malaysia thanks to a better goal difference. In the semi-finals, Thailand faced Indonesia – a young team highly regarded for their speed and technique. The match was tense and tense throughout the official 90 minutes, with neither side scoring a goal. In extra time, captain Weerathep Pomphan shone with the only goal to help Thailand win 1–0, thereby advancing to the final match with Vietnam. However, in that match, Thailand suffered a lot of losses in terms of force as several players received red cards from the referee.

Similar to the host team Vietnam, Thailand entered the final with two important wins by the minimum score after 120 minutes of play, showing the ability to control the game and courage in decisive situations.

=== Player situation ===
Vietnam will be without defender Lê Văn Xuân, who suffered a torn ligament in the semi-final against Malaysia, while Thailand will be without midfielder William Weidersjö, who is suspended after receiving a red card in the semi-final against Malaysia.

== Match ==
=== Summary ===
==== First half ====
Vietnam kicked off the match at 19:00 local time (12:00 UTC) in front of a crowd of 39,898. In the first half, both teams entered the game cautiously, prioritizing control of the midfield and limiting mistakes in their own half. Thailand actively held the ball and organized short combinations to stretch the home team's defense, while Vietnam chose a tight defensive style, waiting for counter-attack opportunities.

Right after the opening whistle, Vietnam took the initiative in the match by quickly pushing up their formation and putting pressure on the opponent's field. The active play helped the home team have a chance to approach the Thai goal very early. In the 3rd minute of the match, Nguyễn Văn Tùng had a chance to finish after a pass from Nguyễn Tiến Linh, however, the striker wearing the number 11 shirt's shot did not go on target, missing the opportunity to open the score for Vietnam. In the first 10 minutes, Thailand proactively played slowly and retreated deep to ensure stability, before gradually regaining the game and balancing the midfield. They began to control the ball more and organized attacks towards the home team's goal. In the 12th minute, Thailand had a chance from a set piece when midfielder Worachit Kanitsribampen executed a technical free kick, sending the ball across the penalty area. However, Văn Tùng – in a defensive support move – promptly jumped high to head the ball away, neutralizing the danger to goalkeeper Nguyễn Văn Toản.

In the following minutes, Vietnam continued to maintain pressure with high balls and took advantage of striker Tien Linh's physique. In the 18th minute, from a cross from the right wing, Tien Linh jumped high to head the ball but the shot went right to the position that veteran goalkeeper Kawin Thamsatchanan had chosen, causing the scoring opportunity to be missed. Then, in the 23rd minute, Tien Linh tried his luck with a long-range shot from more than 30 meters away, but the ball was inaccurate and did not pose a threat to the Thailand goal. On the Thai side, this team organized a number of dangerous combinations. Notably, in the 36th minute, Ben Davies skillfully dribbled past the Vietnam defense and then made a pass inside. However, center-back Thanh Binh intervened in time to prevent a situation that could have led to a goal. In the 43rd minute, Thailand continued to create dangerous opportunities from a corner kick by Weerathep Pomphan. Although the ball was accurately hung into the penalty area, center-back Jonathan Khemdee, who was of Thai-Danish descent, was not in a favorable position to shoot. Before the end of the first half, Vietnam had another notable opportunity. In the 45th minute, from a quick counter-attack, defender Lê Văn Đô made a cross across Kawin's goal, but no home team player was able to get in to finish.

==== Second half ====
Before the second half began, the Vietnamese coaching staff made a tactical adjustment when striker Nhâm Mạnh Dũng was sent onto the field to replace Văn Tùng. This change was intended to increase the attacking power and take advantage of the home team's tall striker's aerial ability. However, it was Thailand who started the second half better. In the 49th minute, Airfan Doloh made a favorable pass for Worachit to comfortably volley in the penalty area. Luckily for Vietnam, the ball went too high over the goal guarded by Văn Toản. Just two minutes later, Worachit continued to be the bright spot in the blue team's attack when he shot just wide of the post, giving the home crowd a heart attack.

From the 60th minute onwards, the game on the pitch was somewhat tilted towards Thailand as they controlled the ball more and organized regular attacks. Under pressure from the opponent, coach Park Hang-seo continued to adjust the squad by taking Huỳnh Công Đến off, giving midfielder Lý Công Hoàng Anh a chance to enter the field in the 65th minute to consolidate the midfield area. In the 70th minute, Vietnam organized a quick counter-attack, in which Nhâm Mạnh Dũng accelerated and made a cross into the penalty area. However, the Thai defender promptly approached and successfully blocked it. In the 75th minute, Thailand had another chance to score when Worachit made a decisive shot near the penalty area, but goalkeeper Văn Toản played focused and caught the ball. In the 78th minute, Vietnam organized an attack coordination between three main pillars in the squad: Nguyễn Hoàng Đức, Đỗ Hùng Dũng and Nguyễn Tiến Linh. Tien Linh's final shot in the penalty area could not overcome the fierce pursuit of the Thai defense. A minute later, from Tuan Tai's pass, Mạnh Dũng had a first-step pass but let the ball touch his hand, causing the opportunity to pass regrettably.

In the following minutes, Vietnam began to increase the pressure. In the 82nd minute, the Vietnamese players created suffocating pressure around the Thai 16m50 area with continuous passing and crossing situations. In the 84th minute, the turning point of the match occurred. From the left wing, defender Phan Tuan Tai made an accurate cross into the central area. Nham Manh Dung jumped high to head the ball in a difficult position, sending the ball in a dangerous trajectory, straight into the top corner, leaving veteran goalkeeper Kawin unable to block. The opening goal helped Vietnam take a 1–0 lead and made the My Dinh stadium explode with joy.

In the remaining time, Thailand focused all their efforts on attacking in search of an equalizer. In the 88th minute, they deployed a high formation and increased pressure, but Vietnam's defense played solidly, maintained a good distance and successfully neutralized the opponent's combinations. In the 3rd minute of extra time (90+3), Vietnam had another chance to increase the gap when Hung Dung made a favorable pass to Tien Linh, but striker number 9 could not finish successfully in the face-off.

In the end, Vietnam won with a score of 1–0.

=== Details ===
May 22, 2022
19:00 UTC+7
Gold medal match

Vietnam	1–0	Thailand
Nhâm Mạnh Dũng 83'	Report

Mỹ Đình National Stadium, Hanoi
Attendance: 39,898
Referee: Mahmood Al Majarafi (Oman)

Vietnam	Thailand

3–5–2
GK	18	Nguyễn Văn Toản
CB	20	Bùi Hoàng Việt Anh
CB	4	Nguyễn Thanh Bình
CB	3	Vũ Tiến Long
RM	7	Lê Văn Đô
CM	14	Nguyễn Hoàng Đức
CM	16	Đỗ Hùng Dũng (c) (yellow card) 68'
CM	15	Huỳnh Công Đến (substituted off) 65'
LM	12	Phan Tuấn Tài (yellow card) 90+4' (substituted off) 90+4'
CF	9	Nguyễn Tiến Linh
CF	11	Nguyễn Văn Tùng (substituted off) 45'
Substitutions:
DF	5	Lương Duy Cương (substituted on) 90+4'
MF	10	Lý Công Hoàng Anh (substituted on) 65'
FW	17	Nhâm Mạnh Dũng (substituted on) 45'
Manager:
(South Korea) Park Hang-seo

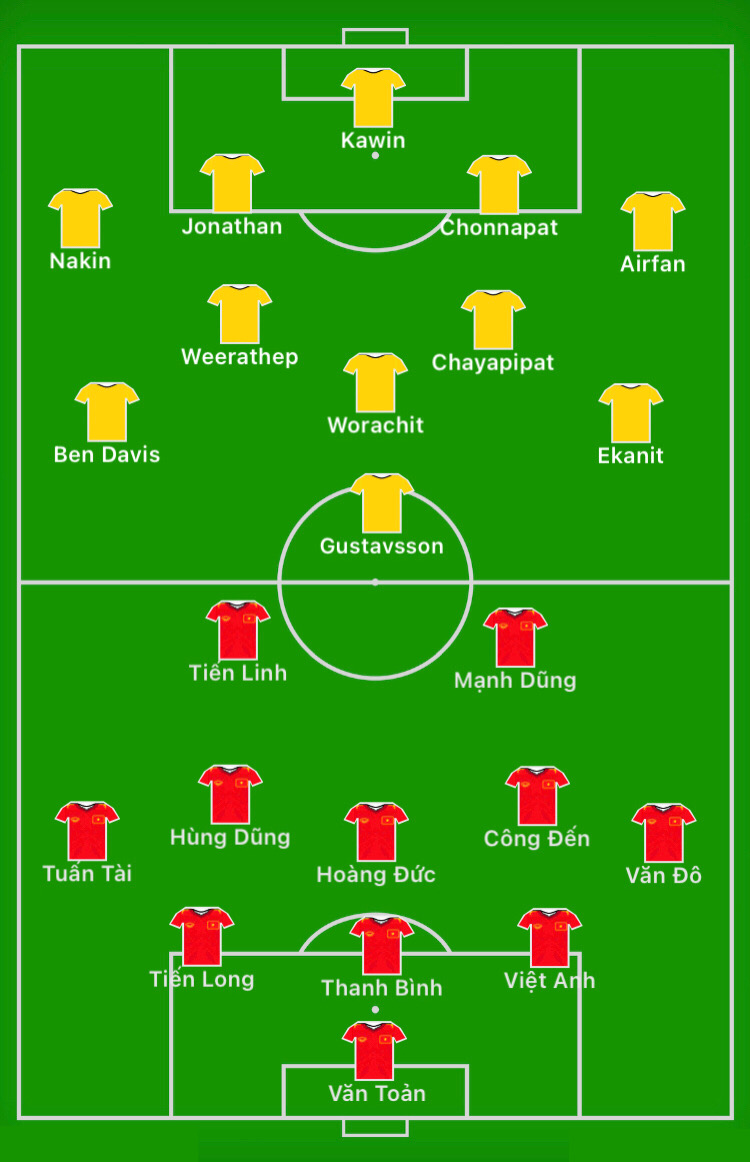

4–2–3–1
GK	1	Kawin Thamsatchanan (c)
RB	2	Nakin Wisetchat
CB	4	Jonathan Khemdee
CB	16	Chonnapat Buaphan (substituted off) 87'
LB	6	Airfan Doloh
CM	18	Weerathep Pomphan
CM	19	Chayapipat Supunpasuch
RW	17	Ben Davis
AM	10	Worachit Kanitsribampen (substituted off) 82'
LW	7	Ekanit Panya
CF	9	Patrik Gustavsson (substituted off) 45'
Substitutions:
DF	3	Mehti Sarakham (substituted on) 87'
FW	13	Teerasak Poeiphimai (substituted on) 82'
FW	8	Korawich Tasa (substituted on) 45'
Manager:
(Germany) (Brazil) Alexandre Pölking

Player of the match:
Nhâm Mạnh Dũng

Assistant referee:
Jang Jong-pil (South Korea)
Masoud Hassan B.Fard (United Arab Emirates)
Fourth official:
Kabilov Nasrulla (Tajikistan)

Match rules

- 90 minutes
- 30 minutes of extra time if necessary
- Penalty shoot-out if scores still level
- Maximum of twelve named substitutes
- Maximum of five substitutions, with a sixth allowed in extra time (Note: Each team was given only three opportunities to make substitutions, with a fourth opportunity in extra time, excluding substitutions made at half-time, before the start of extra time and at half-time in extra time.)
- Maximum of one concussion substitution

== Post-match ==
With this result, Vietnam won the gold medal in men's football at the SEA Games, and this is the second time Vietnam won the gold medal in this competition, after the first time at the 30th SEA Games in 2019. Along with the successful defense of the gold medal in women's football by the women's team on May 21 (1 day before the match), Vietnam won the gold medal for the second consecutive time in both football competitions of the Games. At the same time, this is the first time Vietnam won against Thailand at a SEA Games.

After the match ended, Vietnamese media called this a “deserved achievement” for the country's U-23 team when they kept a clean sheet throughout the tournament and demonstrated their overall perseverance throughout the journey, while emphasizing their fighting spirit, concentration and ability to take advantage of good opportunities. Football fans across Vietnam took to the streets to celebrate the victory, showing their national pride and great support for the team. In addition, they paid special attention to the achievement of winning the SEA Games gold medal for the first time without conceding a goal throughout the tournament, as this was the first time Vietnam had done this.

In contrast to that joy, Thailand described the defeat as “painful” and “tearful”. Matichon reported that Thai fans were left in a state of regret after the unexpected victory of the host team U‑23 Vietnam. Sports TrueID called it a “crushing defeat”, while Siamrath called it a regretful development for the country's U‑23 team. Thailand U‑23 coach Mano Polking admitted that Vietnam deserved to win: “They defended well, played long balls and were patient… Nham Manh Dung's goal was beautiful and proved they deserved to win the championship.” Furthermore, Thai media also noted that coach Polking often had luck when wearing a black shirt, even though he wore a different outfit in the decisive match.

== See also ==
- 2021 SEA Games
- Football at the 2021 SEA Games
- Football at the 2021 SEA Games – Men's tournament
