= Võ Văn Ái =

Vietnamese writer and activist (1935–2023)

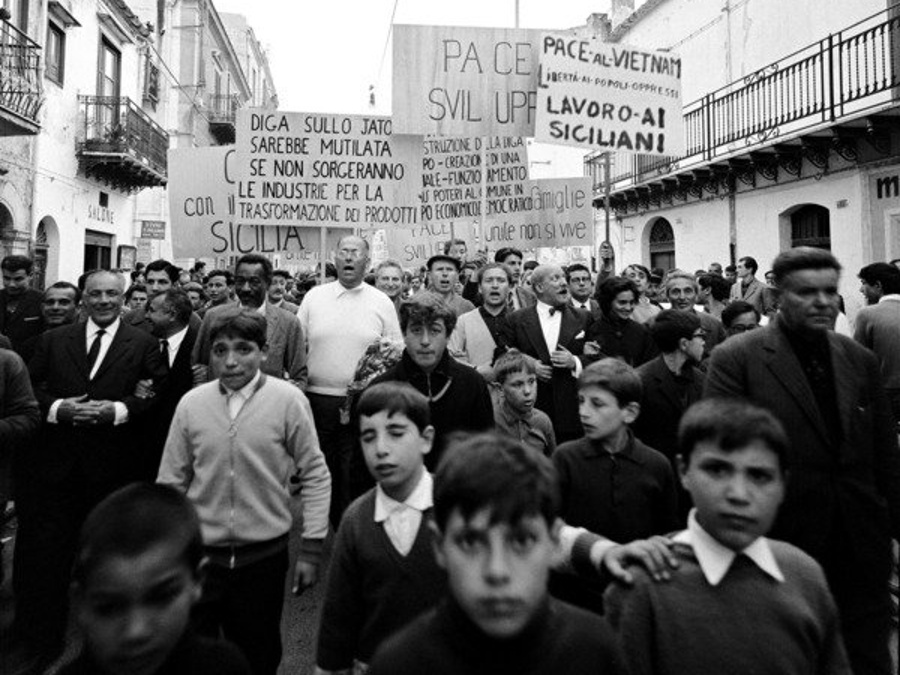
Võ Văn Ái in a march in Partanna, Sicily in 1967. In the picture there are Danilo Dolci, Bruno Zevi, Ernesto Treccani, Antonio Uccello, Lorenzo Barbera and Peppino Impastato.

Võ Văn Ái (19 October 1935 – 26 January 2023) was a Vietnamese poet, journalist, and human-rights activist. He is an expert in the history of Buddhism and of Vietnam. He was a Buddhist and had lived in Paris since the 1950s.

Ái was founder and President of Quê Me: Action for Democracy in Vietnam and the Vietnam Committee on Human Rights, Director of the International Buddhist Information Bureau, and the Overseas Spokesman of the independent Unified Buddhist Church of Vietnam (UBCV), which is currently banned in Vietnam.

A specialist on human rights and religious freedom, he contributed frequently to reports and testimonies to the United Nations, U.S. Congress, and European Parliament.

Ái died on 26 January 2023, at the age of 87.

== Early life and education ==
Born in central Vietnam on 19 October 1935, he moved with his family to Hue when he was five years old. He was arrested, imprisoned, and tortured at the age of 11 for participating in the resistance movement for the independence of Vietnam.

In 1955, he began studying in Paris. Initially he studied medicine, but then enrolled at the Sorbonne to study literature.

== Career ==
=== Unified Buddhist Church of Vietnam (UBCV) ===
From 1963 to 1970, he represented the Unified Buddhist Church of Vietnam abroad and worked actively in the nonviolent Buddhist movement for peace and freedom.

=== Vietnam War ===
During the Vietnam War, he described it as a conflict between "two groups of missionaries" in which the Vietnamese themselves did not have a voice. In August 1968, the New York Review of Books published a letter from Ái about American aircraft dropping napalm on Saigon.

=== Que Me ===
Beginning in 1970, he worked in publishing in Paris. After the Vietnam War ended in 1975, he and several friends in Paris founded the magazine Que Me: Action for Democracy in Vietnam. First published in 1976, the magazine (whose title is the Vietnamese word for homeland) seeks to cover Vietnamese culture, to inform the public about human-rights problems in Communist Vietnam, and to spur international action. It circulates in Vietnamese communities worldwide and clandestinely in Vietnam.

== Critic of Communism ==
After the end of the Vietnam war in 1975, he continued to monitor human rights abuses and violations of religious freedom in Vietnam. He played a key role in drawing world attention to human rights abuses under the country's Communist regime. He drew up the first comprehensive map of the country's 150 "re-education camps" (laogai), which housed over 800,000 prisoners.

Ái has described Communism as a "nihilistic" system built on negative aspects of Western philosophy that "produces a species of slavery," which is to say "living according to the dreams of others and following the orders of others." Communism drains human beings of creativity and destroys their relations with individuals, with the world, with other species, and with the universe. It always "degenerates into bloodsucking," into "political hooliganism."

== Vietnam Committee on Human Rights ==
He was the founder and president of the Vietnam Committee on Human Rights, a Paris-based monitoring organisation that was established in 1976,

== Boat people ==
In 1978 he helped initiate a campaign that rescued boat people who were fleeing Vietnam on the South China Sea.

Ái found it frustrating that Western intellectuals and activists who had marched in the streets against U.S. involvement in Vietnam "remained silent as thousands of Vietnamese died in reeducation camps or drowned on the South China seas." Critics of U.S. involvement in the war, he later wrote, "could not admit that the 'heroic' freedom fighters of yore had turned into tyrants, and the 'henchmen of US imperialists' were now the victims." While Ái recognized the boat people not as economic refugees but as refugees from totalitarianism, it was hard to convince Western leftists of this fact. He managed, however, to persuade a great many leading intellectuals in France and elsewhere to support his campaign for the boat people. The "Boat for Vietnam" Committee was officially established on November 27, 1978, and included such figures as Yves Montand, Brigitte Bardot, Simone Signoret, Raymond Aron, Jean-Paul Sartre, Simone de Beauvoir, Mstislav Rostropovich, and Eugène Ionesco. The campaign helped transform the received thinking on European left.

== Books ==
Áiwrote 17 books of poetry and essays, in addition to studies on Buddhism and Vietnamese history.

== Governments and international organizations ==
In addition to contributing to reports to the U.S. Congress, the United Nations, and the European Parliament, Ái submitted regular reports on human rights and religious freedom to the UN Commission on Human Rights in Geneva. In 1998, he helped prepare Abdelfattah Amor, UN Special Rapporteur on Religious Intolerance, for a visit to Vietnam. He has also been involved in international campaigns to win support for prisoners of conscience in Vietnam and for the promotion of democracy in Vietnam. He has also testified at several US Congressional Hearings on religious freedom in Vietnam.

== Later activities ==
In 2009, Ái spoke at the Oslo Freedom Forum, and in 2011 spoke at The Asean People's Forum about the human rights situation in Vietnam.

In October 2013, the Wall Street Journal ran an article by ÁiVan Ai about Vietnam's "brutal crackdown on free speech," which coincided with a major diplomatic offensive.

In April 2014, the Wall Street Journal published an op-ed by Ái in memory of activist Dinh Dang Dinh, who had recently died of medical neglect. Dinh had spent years in prison for his activism, during which time he had contracted cancer but been denied treatment.

== Other activities and memberships ==
Ái was latterly the Vice-President for Asia of the Paris-based International Federation of Human Rights (FIDH). He was also Director of the International Buddhist Information Bureau, and Overseas Spokesman of the Unified Buddhist Church of Vietnam. He belonged to the Oslo Coalition on Freedom of Religion or Belief. and contributed to several major international studies on religion, such as Freedom of Religion and Belief: A World Report (1997), Religious Freedom in the World (2000), and Human Rights and Asian Values (2000).
