= Nguyễn Duy Quý =

Vietnamese academic and politician (1932–2022)

Member of the Central Committee of the Communist Party of Vietnam
- In office 1991–2001

Member of the National Assembly of Vietnam
- In office 1992–2002

Personal details
- Born: 6 April 1932 Thanh Chương District, French Indochina
- Died: 4 May 2022 (aged 90) Hanoi, Vietnam
- Party: CPV
- Education: Guangxi Normal University; Vietnam National University, Hanoi
- Occupation: Professor

Nguyễn Duy Quý (6 April 1932 – 4 May 2022) was a Vietnamese academic and politician. He served on the Central Committee of the Communist Party of Vietnam and was a member of the National Assembly from 1992 to 2002. He died in Hanoi on 4 May 2022 at the age of 90.
