= 2026 Chinatown car accident =

Traffic incident in Singapore

- Date: 6 February 2026
- Time: 11:50 am (SGT)
- Location: Spring Street, Chinatown, Singapore; 1.2809°N 103.8438°E
- Type: Traffic accident (vehicle-pedestrian collision)
- Cause: Careless driving (alleged)
- Deaths: 1
- Injuries: 1

On 6 February 2026, a fatal traffic incident occurred at Spring Street in Chinatown, Singapore. A 6-year-old Indonesian girl, Sheyna Lashira Smaradiani, was killed after being struck by a car. Her mother was also seriously injured in the collision. The incident drew significant public attention in Singapore and Indonesia.

== Incident ==
On 6 February 2026, at approximately 11:50 am, a 38-year-old female driver in a BYD Sealion 7 was exiting an open-air car park along Spring Street, located near the Buddha Tooth Relic Temple and Museum. As she moved off from the stop line to make a right turn, the vehicle collided with two pedestrians who were crossing the road.

The pedestrians were identified as Sheyna Lashira Smaradiani, 6, and her mother, Raisha Anindra Pascasiswi, 31. The family, including Sheyna's father and younger brother, were Indonesian tourists on holiday in Singapore at the time. Witnesses reported that bystanders used umbrellas to shield the victims from the sun while waiting for emergency services to arrive. The girl was conveyed unconscious to Singapore General Hospital (SGH), where she died from her injuries later that day. Her mother was admitted to the intensive care unit with grievous injuries but was later stabilised and discharged.

== Aftermath ==
The tragedy garnered significant media attention, particularly within Singapore and Indonesia, due to the victims being foreign nationals on holiday and the active role of the Indonesian Embassy in managing the aftermath. The case became a focal point for intense online debate, exacerbated by the driver's nationality as an Indian citizen. Defense counsel highlighted the "vitriolic" nature of these digital discussions when successfully petitioning for a gag order to protect the driver's minor child. The event also prompted a collaborative humanitarian response, with citizens from both countries raising funds to cover the family's hospital bills and burial costs. The father eventually expressed his appreciation for this international show of solidarity through an official statement.

The 6-year-old's remains were repatriated to Jakarta on 8 February 2026, and she was buried the same day at the Tanah Kusir Public Cemetery. The incident sparked a wave of sympathy across social media, with members of the public setting up a memorial at the site of the accident in Chinatown. Further consular assistance from Indonesia was also provided to the family and coordinated with the Singapore Police Force (SPF) during the investigation.

== Legal proceedings ==
On 8 April 2026, the 38-year-old driver, an Indian national, was charged in the State Courts of Singapore. She faced two charges under the Road Traffic Act 1961:

- Driving without due care and attention causing death.
- Driving without due care and attention causing grievous hurt.

The court imposed a gag order on the driver’s 6-year-old son, protecting the identity of the driver. This order was granted because he was a passenger in the car at the time of the accident and is a potential witness in the case; identifying the mother would inadvertently identify the child. The defense also cited "xenophobic" and "vitriolic" online comments directed at the accused and her son as a basis for the order. If convicted of causing death by careless driving, the driver faces a fine of up to $10,000, a prison term of up to three years, or both. The case is scheduled for a pre-trial conference on 13 May 2026.

== See also ==
- 2026 in Singapore
