= Thạch Thất =

- Commune
- Interactive map of Thạch Thất
- Coordinates: 21.055849537150536°N 105.57824635579294°E
- Country: Vietnam
- Region: Red River Delta
- Municipality: Hanoi
- Administrative headquarters: Route 419

Area
  - Total: 31.93 km^{2} (12.33 sq mi)

Population (2025)
  - Total: 57,645
  - Density: 1,805/km^{2} (4,670/sq mi)
- Website: thachthat.hanoi.gov.vn

Thạch Thất is a commune in the municipality of Hanoi, Vietnam.

On 16 June 2025, district-level administrative units nationwide ceased to operate.

On the same date, the Standing Committee of the National Assembly of Vietnam issued Resolution No. 1656/NQ-UBTVQH15 on the arrangement of commune-level administrative units in Hanoi in 2025. Under the resolution, the entire area and population of Liên Quan township and Cẩm Yên, Đại Đồng, Kim Quan, Lại Thượng, and Phú Kim communes, formerly part of Thạch Thất district, were merged to form a new commune named Thạch Thất.
