= Y Quynh Bđăp =

Vietnamese Christian activist

Y Quynh Bđăp is a member of the Ede ethnic group from Đắk Lắk province, one of the Montagnard indigenous peoples native to Vietnam's Central Highlands, who co-founded the Montagnards Stand for Justice organization that supports freedom of religion and Montagnard rights. Recognized as a political refugee by the United Nations High Commissioner for Refugees, Y Quynh lived in Thailand between 2018 and his extradition in 2025.

== 2024 arrest ==
In January 2024, the Vietnamese government convicted Y Quynh in absentia of terrorism charges in connection to the 2023 Đắk Lắk attacks, sentencing him to 10 years in prison.

On 11 June 2024, Y Quynh was arrested by immigration police in Bangkok and held at Bangkok Remand Prison. In October 2024, Quynh's extradition to Vietnam was approved by the Criminal Court in Bangkok, whose decision was criticized by Thailand's National Human Rights Commission (NHRC) and Human Rights Watch (HRW) which both state that he faces torture if extradited.

On 28 November 2025, according to his lawyer, Y Quynh was extradited to Vietnam.
