= Nguyễn Hoàng Vi =

Vietnamese independent journalist (born 1987)

Nguyễn Hoàng Vi (born 4 March 1987) is a Vietnamese independent journalist, known for her reporting on human rights issues in Vietnam.

== Journalism ==
Vi became known for her writing for independent news outlets in Vietnam; after many of these were shut down by Vietnamese authorities, she started to post her articles on social media, including Facebook and Blogger. She was known for her reports on human rights issues, including the harassment and imprisonment of independent journalists and human rights activists. Vi was also known as a pro-democracy activist.

== Harassment ==
Vi has been arrested and detained on multiple occasions in response to her journalism.

On 28 December 2012, after publishing an article on the experiences of journalists and human rights activists in the Vietnamese criminal justice system, she was detained and questioned by police officers at a police station in the Nguyễn Cư Trinh (now Cầu Ông Lãnh) ward of Ho Chi Minh City. Vi subsequently reported that she had been physically and sexually assaulted by officers, including being beaten, stripped, and undergoing a vaginal cavity search.

On 6 May 2013, Vi was assaulted by police officers while attending a "human rights picnic" with her family. Later that year, she was assaulted while commemorating Human Rights Day at a coffee shop on 10 December. A year later, Vi was physically assaulted by plainclothes near her home in Ho Chi Minh City as she prepared to mark Human Rights Day 2014 with the Vietnam Bloggers Network.

On 19 March 2026, Vi was arrested by police officers while transporting her child to school. This occurred shortly after she had posted skeptical comments online about voting and voter registration ahead of the 2026 Vietnamese legislative election, and after she had refused both to vote and to return her ballot to election officials. Vi was detained for 10 hours at a police station in Phú Thạnh, where she reported she was struck on the head with a sandal by a police officer and forced to sign a "stack" of paperwork consisting of printouts of posts she had me on Facebook. She was subsequently released without charge.

The Committee to Protect Journalists called on Vietnamese authorities to investigate the alleged assault and arbitrary detention of Vi.
