= 2023 Đắk Lắk attacks =

Attacks in Đắk Lắk, Vietnam

Đắk Lắk Commune People's Committee headquarters attack
- Part of aftermath of FULRO insurgency and Communist Party of Vietnam-Montagnards insurgents conflict
- Terrorists of the Montagnard groups that carried out the attack
- Location of the incident
- Native name: Vụ tấn công hai trụ sở Ủy ban nhân dân xã tại Đắk Lắk 2023
- Location: 12.612838°N 108.114578°E; 12.614044°N 108.114688°E; Ea Tiêu and Ea Ktur police station, Cư Kuin district, Đắk Lắk province, Vietnam
- Date: June 11, 2023; 00:35 (ICT, UTC+07:00)
- Target: Ea Tiêu and Ea Ktur police stations
- Attack type: Mass murder, mass shootings
- Weapons: Knives, swords, air rifles, SKS and M16 rifles, grenades, Molotov cocktails
- Deaths: 9 (4 police officers, 2 officials, and 3 civilians)
- Injuries: 2
- Perpetrator: Degar State militias
- No. of participants: 84 individuals, with 75 arrests
- Defenders: Vietnam People's Public Security: Mobile Police Command; Vietnam People's Army: Special Operation Force; Border Guard Command
- Motive: Separatism
- Accused: Terrorist attack towards civilians as a leverage for secession of Montagnard territories from Vietnam

On June 11, 2023, an unidentified group of separatists attacked the People's Committee headquarters of the Ea Tiêu and Ea Ktur communes in Cư Kuin district, Đắk Lắk province, Vietnam, resulting in 9 fatalities and 2 seriously injured individuals. Simultaneously, numerous papers and documents were set on fire and destroyed. As of June 23, 2023, a total of 75 individuals have been arrested in connection with the shooting incident out of a total of 84 individuals involved. The Vietnamese government has referred to this as "an act of terrorism aimed at overthrowing the people's government."

== Background ==
The Central Highlands region occupies a significant portion of Vietnam's coffee-growing area. It is also home to several ethnic minority groups categorized as Montagnards. This region has long been considered a hotspot for land disputes and racial persecution perpetuated by the Vietnamese. During the Vietnam War, the Montagnards reluctantly collaborated with the South Vietnamese government due to American pressure, but their alliance was fractious and hostile due to South Vietnam's state-sponsored migration and cultural discrimination that displaced Montagnards. In 1974, a Montagnard rebellion against the government was brutally crushed by the ARVN. The newly established communist government in 1975 also did nothing to improve the lives of Montagnards and even escalated the persecution of tribes that began under Ngô Đình Diệm.

Some demand greater autonomy rights, while others who are in exile abroad support separatism. On September 20, 2000, Christian priest Bdasu K'Bông, with the support of United Front for the Liberation of Oppressed Races (FULRO), established the "Tin lành Đê-ga" (Degar Evangelical Church) in Vietnam with the aim of advocating for the establishment of an independent Degar state. There have been some separatist movements operating in the Central Highlands, who organized two major protests in 2001 and 2004.

At the end of May 2022, the People's Committee of Cu Kuin district carried out the forced demolition of 64 structures believed to have been illegally constructed on coffee land managed by Việt Thắng Coffee Limited Liability Company in Ea Tiêu commune, as well as 500 other structures. On February 28, 2023, the same district carried out forced land reclamation and clearance to implement the project of the Hồ Chí Minh road bypass in the eastern part of Buôn Ma Thuột. However, the eviction was halted on March 4. In May 2023, a reporter from the Tiền Phong newspaper was threatened with death after publishing an exposé on illegal land exploitation and subsequently bringing attention to the construction site within this area.

== Shooting ==
Scene of the shooting at the headquarters of the People's Committee of Ea Tiêu commune, Đắk Lắk

At around 12:35 am (UTC+7:00) on June 11, 2023, a group of approximately 50 unidentified individuals split into two groups and armed themselves with guns, knives, Molotov cocktails, and grenades to attack the People's Committee headquarters in Ea Tiêu and Ea Ktur communes of Cư Kuin district. At the location, the group shot and stabbed four police officers to death and severely injured several others. Many documents and papers were burned, and the windows and main entrance were smashed. Upon receiving the report, Nguyễn Văn Dũng, the Chairman of the People's Committee of Ea Tiêu commune, and Nguyễn Văn Kiên, the Communist Party Secretary of Ea Ktur commune, arrived at the scene but were immediately intercepted and fatally shot by the group. While fleeing, the perpetrators stopped civilian vehicles and killed its occupants. As a result, a total of nine people died and two others were injured. The group also captured three hostages; two were later rescued, while one managed to escape on their own.

== Victims ==
The attacks resulted in the death of 4 commune police officers, 2 commune officials, and 3 civilians. The four deceased commune police officers were Hoàng Trung (Major, People's Public Security), Trần Quốc Thắng (Major, People's Public Security), Hà Tuấn Anh (Captain, People's Public Security), Nguyễn Đăng Nhân (Captain, People's Public Security). The two deceased commune officials were Nguyễn Văn Kiên (Party Secretary, Chairman of the People's Council of Ea Ktur commune) and Nguyễn Văn Dũng (Deputy Party Secretary, Chairman of the People's Committee of Ea Tiêu commune). Two other individuals injured in the attack are Đàm Đình Bốp (Senior lieutenant, People's Public Security) and Lê Kiên Cường (Captain, People's Public Security).

== Arrests and investigations ==
=== Arrests ===
On the afternoon of June 11, following the attack and shooting incident, the Ministry of Public Security of Vietnam issued a statement and directed the units to surround and apprehend the individuals responsible for the incident. On the first day, local law enforcement forces arrested 16 suspects and successfully rescued two hostages. Additionally, another civilian was initially held as a hostage but managed to free themselves. By the second day after the incident, the total number of individuals arrested had reached 26. By the end of June 13, the number of individuals arrested had reached 46 suspects, with 3 of them being the main culprits who surrendered themselves. As of June 17, a total of 62 individuals have been arrested or surrendered in connection with the shooting incident. According to the Ministry of Public Security of Vietnam, local authorities have invited 109 individuals for questioning and temporarily detained 74 suspects. In addition, 15 firearms and 1,199 rounds of ammunition have been seized. Until the case was officially prosecuted on June 23, the number of individuals arrested was 75 out of a total of 84 individuals involved.

=== Investigations ===
According to Vietnam Television, most of the individuals involved in the attacks are residing in the Đắk Lắk province. Some of the participants have stated that they were "enticed and lured" by certain individuals. According to their testimonies, they were promised money and assets after executing the attack. Prior to the assault, these individuals also thoroughly discussed and assigned weapon responsibilities to each participating member.

From June 3 to 6, Y Som (residing in Đắk Lắk province) is believed to be the leader who made phone calls urging people to cross the border and leave Vietnam. Y Som promised to provide each person with 100 million VNĐ (equivalent to US$5,000 in 2025) upon leaving Vietnam. After those days, more than 50 individuals from different localities in Đắk Lắk and Gia Lai provinces gathered at a makeshift camp in Cư Kuin to execute the plan. Around 1 a.m. on June 11, the group split into two and attacked the People's Committee headquarters of Ea Tiêu and Ea Ktur communes. According to Tô Ân Xô, the spokesperson of the Ministry of Public Security, this group of individuals was instructed to "kill, rob properties, and seize firearms and ammunition" if they encounter local officials and police officers at the commune level. The purpose of the attack is said to be "weapon theft, creating a sensation, and having the illusion of going abroad". Y Thô Ayun, one of the individuals accused of leading the shooting incident, has admitted to "propagating and inciting" many residents in Đắk Lắk province. He stated that he only spread his message to those who believed in his actions.

On June 23, the Vietnamese media reported the criminal prosecution of a case involving 75 individuals who were arrested on charges of "Terrorism against the people's authorities"; 7 individuals on charges of "Failure to report criminal activities"; 1 individual on charges of "Concealing criminals"; and 1 individual on charges of "Organizing, brokering illegal emigration, immigration, or residence in Vietnam."

A total of 53 people were convicted over the incident. In January 2024, Y Quynh Bđăp, the cofounder of the group Montagnards Stand for Justice, was convicted in absentia by a Vietnamese court on terrorism charges and sentenced to 10 years imprisonment for allegedly organizing the attacks. Quynh, who was seeking asylum in Canada, was arrested in Thailand in June. A Bangkok court approved his extradition in September despite concerns over his safety by human rights groups. His extradition was finalized on 28 November 2025.

== Reactions ==
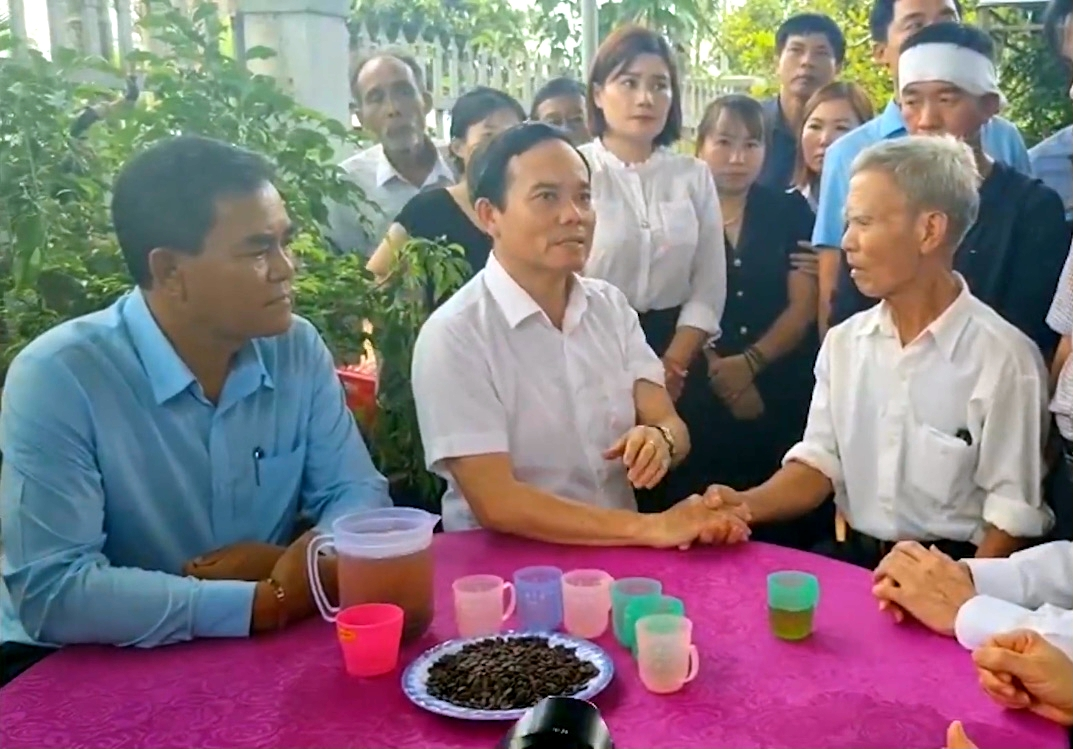
Deputy Prime Minister Trần Lưu Quang visits victims in Đắk Lắk

According to Radio Free Asia, shortly after the incident, VnExpress published an article citing information from the Ministry of Public Security, stating that at least 7 people were killed in the gunfire, but this information was later removed. On the same day, the Ministry of Public Security issued an order to hunt down the perpetrators, reminding the public to remain calm, and requesting the media to verify accurate information. In the afternoon, Minister of Public Security Tô Lâm decided to promote the ranks of the 4 police officers who died in the incident. On the morning of June 12, Deputy Prime Minister Trần Lưu Quang visited and inquired about the injured individuals and the families of those who died. He also instructed the recognition of martyr status for the 4 deceased police officers. Deputy Chief of the General Staff of the Vietnam People's Army, Huỳnh Chiến Thắng, led a delegation from the Ministry of Defense to inspect the scene of the incident.

According to BBC Vietnamese, within just half a day on June 11, there were 2,258 articles, forum posts, and social media discussions about the attack. Among them, there were 386 news articles and 1,707 posts originating from social media platforms, predominantly from Facebook. Local authorities have also imposed administrative fines on several individuals for spreading fake news about the shooting incident. In Đắk Lắk alone, more than 100 cases have been fined. On June 12, Phil Robertson, deputy director of the Asia Division at Human Rights Watch, stated: "Behind the veil of secrecy that Vietnam has cast over the highlands, the government has seriously violated rights, suppressed religious and belief freedoms, confiscated lands from indigenous peoples, and attempted to assimilate the cultural, linguistic, and social diversity of ethnic groups, particularly those dominated by the ethnic majority, the Kinh".

On June 20, 2023, at Third United Nations High-Level Conference of Heads of Counter-Terrorism Agencies of Member States organized by the United Nations, Vietnam's representative requested the intervention and support of other countries in investigating the attack, as there were members involved in the shooting incident belonging to an organization based in the United States. United States ambassador to Vietnam Marc Knapper condemned the attack and proposed to cooperate with the Vietnamese side to find the perpetrators.

In March 2024, the Vietnam Ministry of Public Security officially designated the North Carolina-headquartered Montagnard Support Group Inc (MSGI) and the Thai-based Montagnard Stand for Justice (MSFJ) as terrorist organizations, declaring them of orchestrating attacks and promoting separatism in Vietnam.

== See also ==
- Persecution of the Montagnard in Vietnam
- United Front for the Liberation of Oppressed Races
