= National Day (Vietnam) =

Vietnamese holiday

Independence Day Ngày Quốc khánh
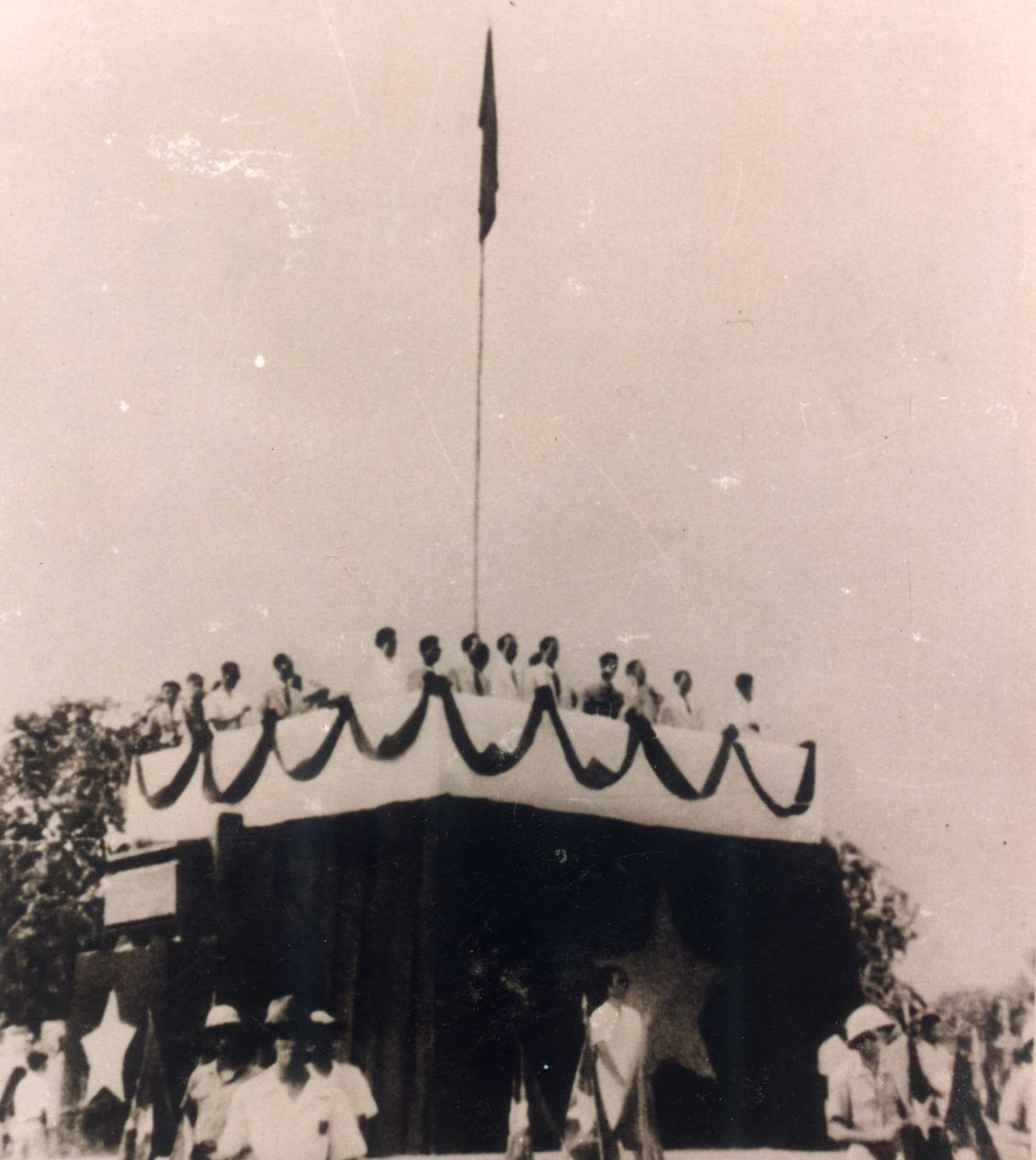
- Ho Chi Minh reads the Declaration of independence of the Democratic Republic of Vietnam on 2 September 1945.
- Official name: Ngày Quốc khánh
- Observed by: Vietnam
- Type: National
- Significance: Declaring Vietnamese independence from the French and Japanese
- Date: 2 September
- Next time: 2 September 2026
- Frequency: Annual

Post-1954 reenactment of President Ho Chi Minh reading the declaration of Vietnam's independence

Independence Day (Vietnamese: Ngày Quốc khánh) is a national holiday in Vietnam observed on 2 September, commemorating President Ho Chi Minh reading the Declaration of independence of the Democratic Republic of Vietnam at Ba Đình Square in Hanoi on 2 September 1945. It is the country's national day.

== History ==
During World War II, the Japanese occupied Vietnam and allowed the French to remain and exert some influence. At the war's end in August 1945, a power vacuum was created in Vietnam. Capitalizing on this, the Việt Minh launched the "August Revolution" across the country to seize government offices. Emperor Bảo Đại abdicated on 25 August 1945, ending the Nguyễn dynasty. On 2 September 1945, at Ba Đình Square, Hanoi, Ho Chi Minh, leader of the Viet Minh, declared Vietnam's independence under the new name of the Democratic Republic of Vietnam (DRVN) in a speech that invoked the United States Declaration of Independence and the French Revolution's Declaration of the Rights of Man and the Citizen. It was also the day Japan formally signed the document to officially surrender to the Allies, ending World War II.

== Establishment ==
Initially called Vietnam Independence Day, 2 September was first referred to as National Day in 1954. The communist leadership established a unified list of national holidays. These new holidays were to include the International Labour Day on 1 May, the anniversary of the August Revolution on 19 August, Viet Nam's National Day on 2 September, and Ho Chi Minh's birthday on 19 May. The lunar new year, Tết Nguyên Đán and the mid-autumn moon, Tết Trung Thu, continued to be observed as traditionally. In 2025, Vietnam held the largest military parade in history to celebrate the 80th anniversary of National Day, on land, in the air and at sea.

The list of full public holidays in Vietnam has been revised since 2007 but National Day, 2 September, remains a full public and bank holiday. By 2019, the holiday was lengthened by one day by adding one day immediately before or after 2 September.
