= Isocoumarin =

Names
- Preferred IUPAC name 1H-2-Benzopyran-1-one
- Other names Iso-coumarin; 1H-Isochromen-1-one; 3,4-Benzo-2-pyrone

Identifiers
CAS Number	491-31-6
3D model (JSmol)	Interactive image
ChEBI	CHEBI:38759
ChEMBL	ChEMBL457811
ChemSpider	61416
PubChem CID	68108
UNII	SR89982S3E
CompTox Dashboard (EPA)	DTXSID8060080
- InChI: InChI=1S/C9H6O2/c10-9-8-4-2-1-3-7(8)5-6-11-9/h1-6H Key: IQZZFVDIZRWADY-UHFFFAOYSA-N
- SMILES: O=C2O\C=C/c1c2cccc1

Properties
Chemical formula	C_{9}H_{6}O_{2}
Molar mass	146.145 g·mol^{−1}
- Except where otherwise noted, data are given for materials in their standard state (at 25 °C [77 °F], 100 kPa). verify (what is ?) Infobox references

Isocoumarin (1H-2-benzopyran-1-one; 3,4-benzo-2-pyrone) is a lactone, a type of natural organic compound.

== Known natural compounds ==
- Thunberginol A and B

dihydroisocoumarins

- Hydrangenol
- Phyllodulcin
- Thunberginol C, D, E and G
- The derivative 3-acetyl-3,4-dihydro-5,6-dimethoxy-1H-2-benzopyran-1-one can be found in Huáng bǎi (Phellodendron chinense), one of the fifty fundamental herbs of traditional Chinese medicine.

== See also ==
- Coumarin
