= C15H12O5 =

The chemical formula C_{15}H_{12}O_{5} (molar mass : 272.25 g/mol, exact Mass 272.068473 u) may refer to:

- Butein, a chalcone
- Butin (molecule), a flavanone
- Garbanzol, a flavanonol
- Glycinol (pterocarpan)
- Griseoxanthone C, a xanthone
- Naringenin, a flavanone
- Naringenin chalcone, a chalcone
- Pinobanksin, a dihydroflavonol
- Thunberginol C, an isocoumarin
- Thunberginol G, an isocoumarin
