= Mellein =

- Chemical structure of mellein

Names
- IUPAC name 8-Hydroxy-3-methyl-3,4-dihydroisochromen-1-one
- Other names (−)-Mellein (R)-(−)-Mellein; Ochracin; 3,4-Dihydro-8-hydroxy-3-methyl-1H-2-benzopyran-1-one

Identifiers
CAS Number	480-33-1
3D model (JSmol)	Interactive image
ChEBI	CHEBI:38760
ChEMBL	ChEMBL226090
ChemSpider	26529
PubChem CID	28516
UNII	Y30Y67M5SV
CompTox Dashboard (EPA)	DTXSID60891794
- InChI: InChI=1S/C10H10O3/c1-6-5-7-3-2-4-8(11)9(7)10(12)13-6/h2-4,6,11H,5H2,1H3 Key: KWILGNNWGSNMPA-UHFFFAOYSA-N
- SMILES: CC1CC2=C(C(=CC=C2)O)C(=O)O1

Properties
Chemical formula	C_{10}H_{10}O_{3}
Molar mass	178.187 g·mol^{−1}
- Except where otherwise noted, data are given for materials in their standard state (at 25 °C [77 °F], 100 kPa). Infobox references

Mellein is a dihydroisocoumarin, a phenolic compound produced by the mold species Aspergillus ochraceus.

== Derivatives ==
4-Hydroxymellein is also produced by Aspergillus ochraceus.

6-Hydroxymellein, together with S-adenosyl methionine, is a substrate of the enzyme 6-hydroxymellein O-methyltransferase to form 6-methoxymellein and S-adenosylhomocysteine in Apiaceae. 6-Methoxymellein is one of the compounds responsible for bitterness in carrots.
