= C15H12O4 =

The chemical formula C_{15}H_{12}O_{4} (molar mass : 256.25 g/mol, exact mass 256.073559 u) may refer to:

- Gnetucleistol C, a stiblenoid
- Hydrangeic acid, a stilbenoid
- Hydrangenol, an isocoumarin
- Isoliquiritigenin, a chalcone
- Liquiritigenin, a flavanone
- Pinocembrin, a flavanone
- Monobenzyl phthalate
