= Trihydroxyflavanone =

Trihydroxyflavanone may refer to:

- Butin (molecule) (3',4',7-trihydroxyflavanone)
- Garbanzol (3,7,4'-trihydroxyflavanone)
- Naringenin (4',5,7-trihydroxyflavanone)
- Pinobanksin (3,5,7-trihydroxyflavanone)
