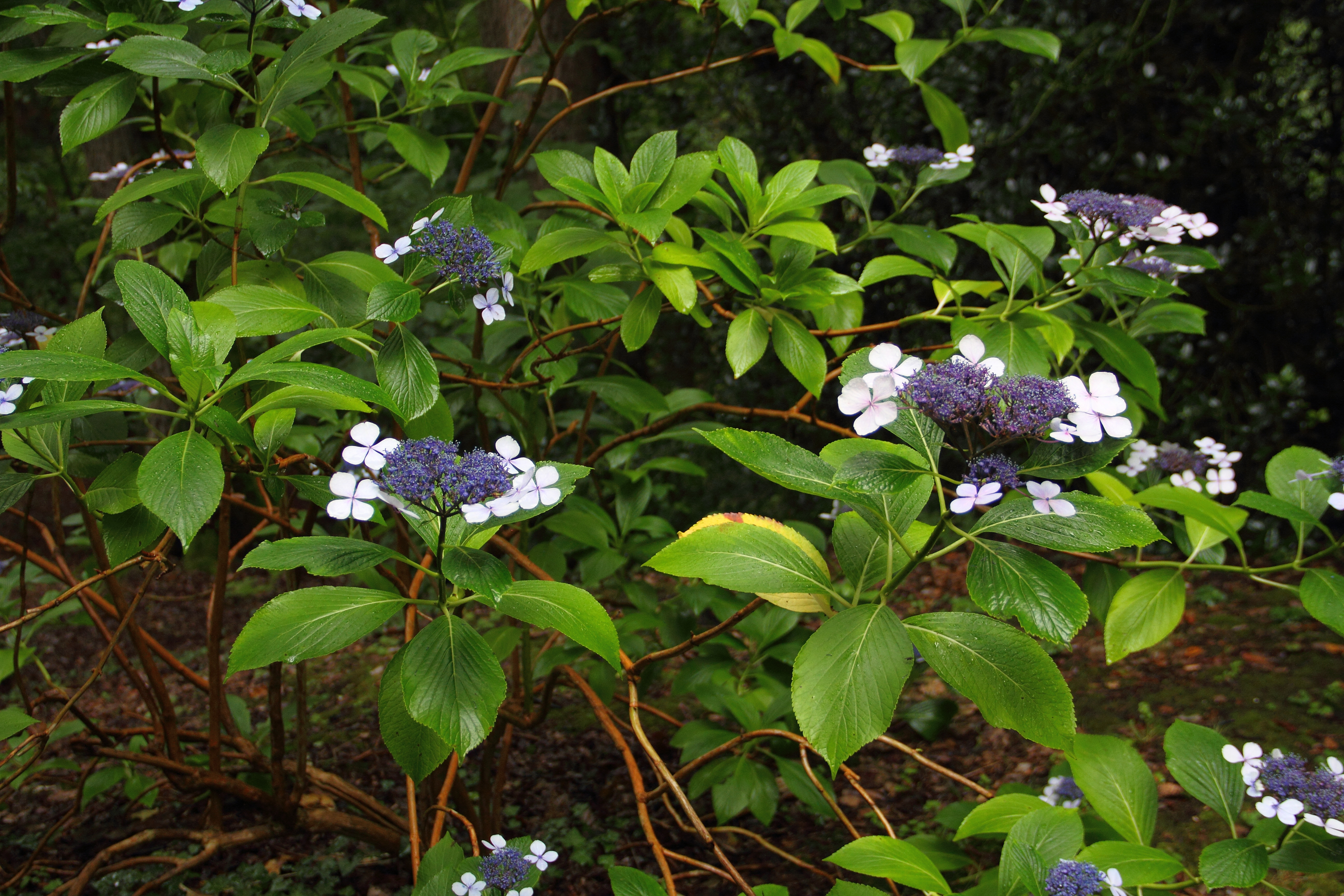
- H. serrata

Scientific classification
- Kingdom: Plantae
- Clade: Tracheophytes
- Clade: Angiosperms
- Clade: Eudicots
- Clade: Asterids
- Order: Cornales
- Family: Hydrangeaceae
- Genus: Hydrangea
- Species: H. serrata

Binomial name
- Hydrangea serrata (Thunb.) Ser.

Synonyms
- H. macrophylla serrata

= Hydrangea serrata =

Species of flowering plant

Hydrangea serrata is a species of flowering plant in the family Hydrangeaceae, native to mountainous regions of Korea and Japan. Common names include mountain hydrangea and tea of heaven. Growing to 1.2 m (4 ft) tall and broad, it is a deciduous shrub with oval leaves and panicles of blue and pink flowers in summer and autumn (fall). It is widely cultivated as an attractive ornamental shrub throughout the world in areas with suitable climate and soil.

== Taxonomy ==
Considerable difficulties exist in the nomenclature for H. serrata and closely associated hydrangeas. It is treated here as an individual species in accordance with van Gelderen and van Gelderen. Many botanists, however, view it as no more than a subspecies of H. macrophylla.

== Characteristics ==
Hydrangea serrata is similar to H. macrophylla except it is a smaller more compact shrub with smaller flowers and leaves; it is also more hardy. With a rounded habit, it features dark green, serrated (toothed), ovate leaves to 15 cm (6 in) long, and clusters of long-blooming blue or pink lacy flowerheads in mid- to late summer. Both showy sterile florets and less showy fertile florets appear in each cluster. The flowers are perfect, having both male and female parts; they are insect-pollinated.

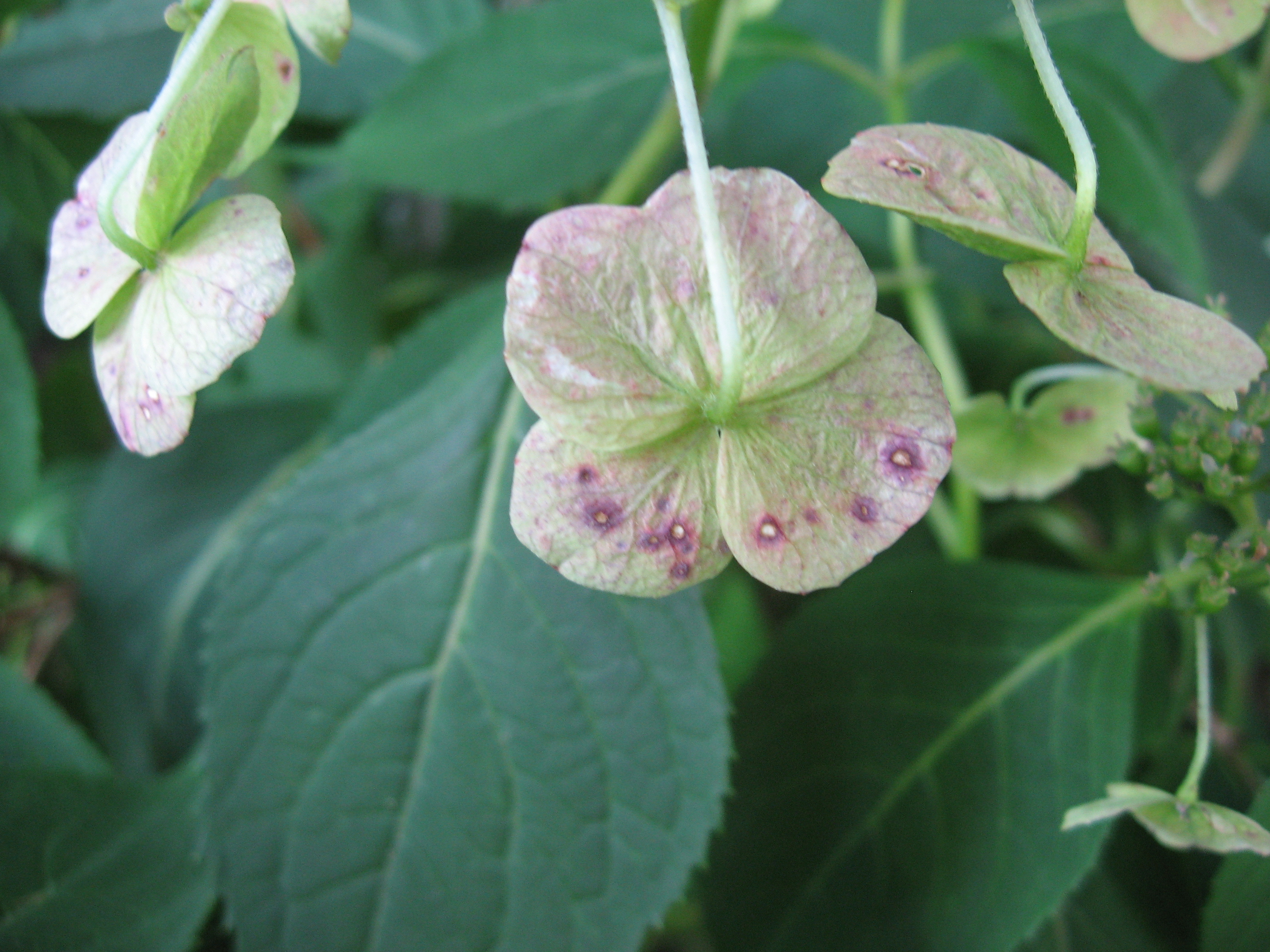
A closeup of several flowers

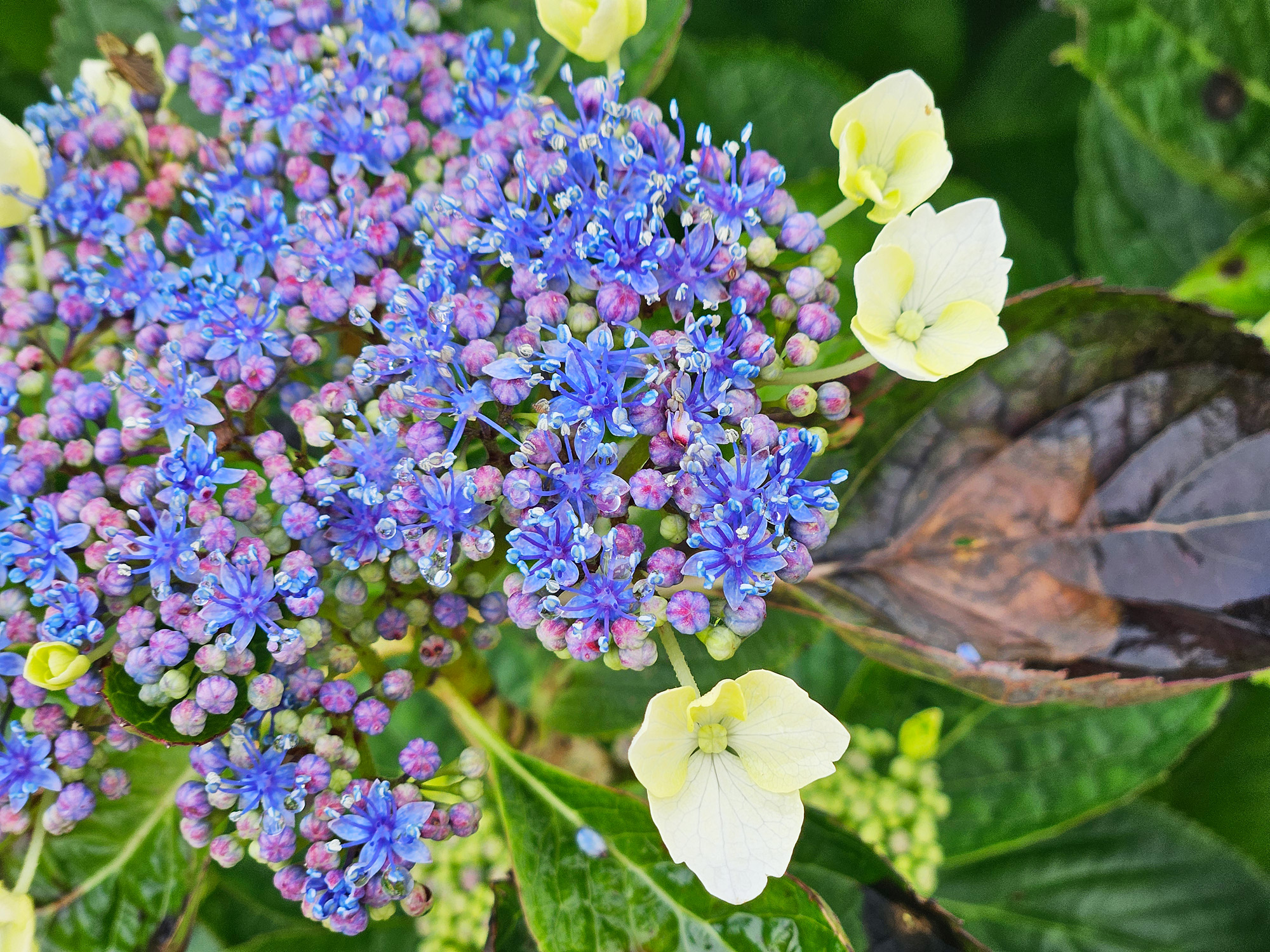
Hydrangea serrata (Thunb.) Ser.

== Cultivation ==
Hydrangea serrata is best grown in rich, medium moisture, well-drained soils in partial shade. It tolerates full sun only if grown with consistently moist soils. Soil pH affects the flower color in the same manner as it does with H. macrophylla—namely, bluish in highly acidic soils and lilac to pink in slightly acidic to alkaline soils. Limited colour change can be achieved with pink and blue varieties on neutral soils by the careful use of soil additives. The flowers occur on old wood, and little pruning is needed. It may be pruned after flowering by cutting back flowering stems to a pair of healthy buds. Weak or winter-damaged stems can be pruned in early spring.

It is winter hardy to USDA Zone 6, and it can be grown in USDA Zone 5 with protection (e.g., mulch and burlap wrap). It may lose significant numbers of flower buds or die to the ground in harsh winters, impairing or decimating the bloom for the coming year. Plants are hardy to about −25 °C (−13 °F) when dormant, but the young growth in spring can be killed by late frosts.

Hydrangea serrata makes a good specimen or accent plant for protected locations near homes or patios. It can be grown as a low hedge, and it is quite wind tolerant.

=== Propagation ===
Seeds can be surface sown in a greenhouse in spring. When large enough, seedlings may be outplanted into individual pots. Softwood cuttings can be rooted during summer, as can hardwood cuttings during fall and winter. Mound layering can be accomplished in the spring.

=== Problems ===
Some susceptibility occurs to honey fungus, bud blight, bacterial wilt, leaf spot, and powdery mildew. Aphids are occasional summer pests.

=== Cultivars ===
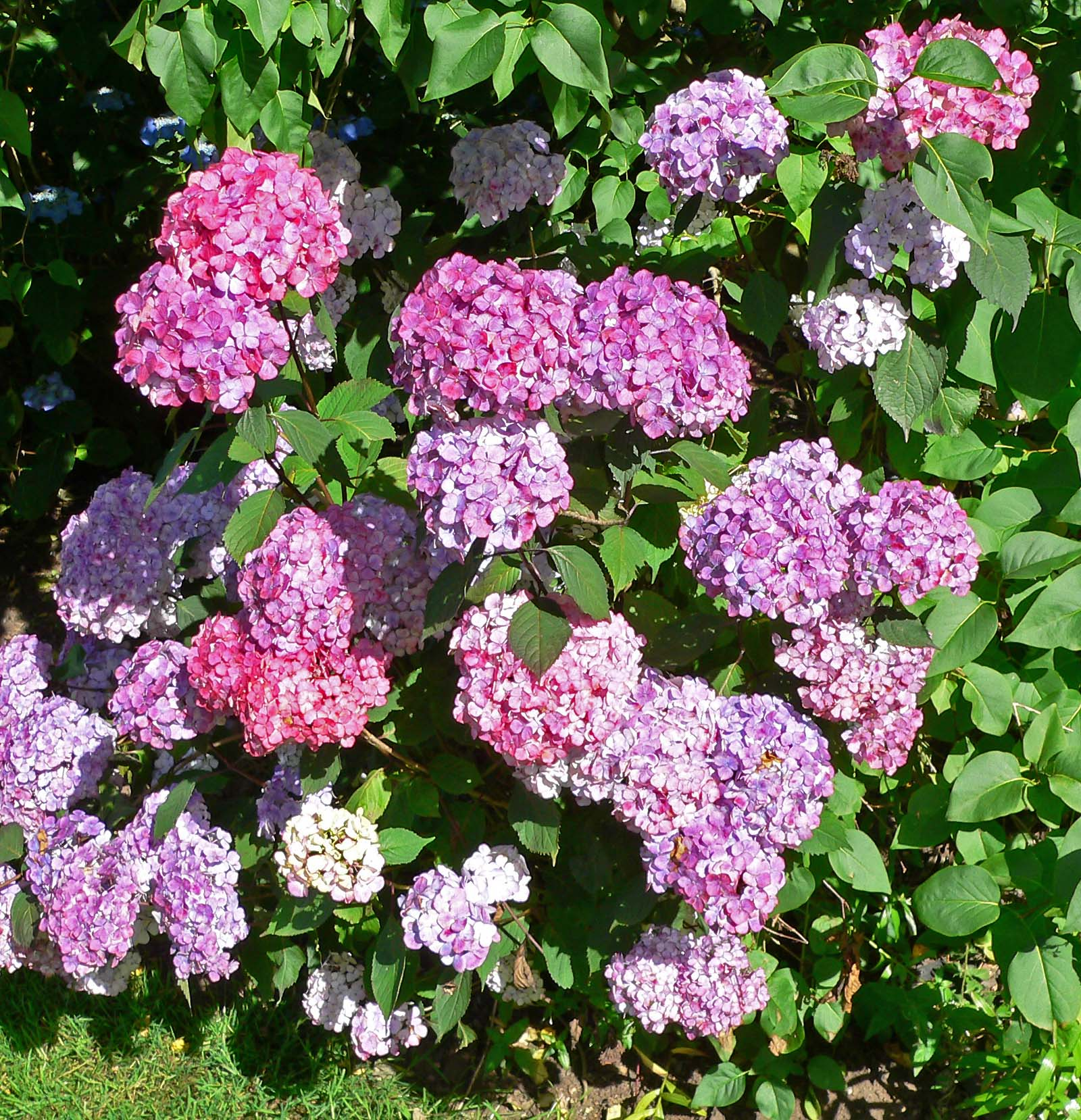
H. serrata 'Preziosa'

Numerous cultivars have been selected for garden use, of which the following have gained the Royal Horticultural Society's Award of Garden Merit:-

- 'Bluebird'
- 'Diadem'
- 'Grayswood'
- 'Kiyosumi'
- 'Miranda'
- 'Miyama-yae-murasaki'
- 'Preziosa'
- 'Rosalba'
- 'Shirofuji'
- 'Shojo'
- 'Tiara'

== Other uses ==
The leaves of mountain hydrangea contain phyllodulcin, a natural sweetener, and are used to make regionally popular tisanes. Amacha (甘茶), also made from H. macrophylla var. thunbergii, is an herbal tea used in Japan in the celebration of Buddha's birth. For Korean tea, H. serrata, called sansuguk (산수국; 山水菊) in Korean, is used for an herbal tea called sugukcha (수국차) or isulcha (이슬차).

== Chemistry ==
Phyllodulcin is an isocoumarin found in H. serrata.
