= Dihydroxyflavanone =

Dihydroxyflavanone may refer to:

- Liquiritigenin (4',7-dihydroxyflavanone)
- Pinocembrin (5,7-dihydroxyflavanone)
