= Lunularin =

Names
- Preferred IUPAC name 3-[2-(4-Hydroxyphenyl)ethyl]phenol

Identifiers
CAS Number	37116-80-6
3D model (JSmol)	Interactive image
ChemSpider	157893
KEGG	C10269
PubChem CID	181511
UNII	AXG9EP247C
CompTox Dashboard (EPA)	DTXSID20190614
- InChI: InChI=1S/C14H14O2/c15-13-8-6-11(7-9-13)4-5-12-2-1-3-14(16)10-12/h1-3,6-10,15-16H,4-5H2 Key: ILEYXPCRQKRNIJ-UHFFFAOYSA-N; InChI=1/C14H14O2/c15-13-8-6-11(7-9-13)4-5-12-2-1-3-14(16)10-12/h1-3,6-10,15-16H,4-5H2 Key: ILEYXPCRQKRNIJ-UHFFFAOYAQ
- SMILES: c1cc(cc(c1)O)CCc2ccc(cc2)O

Properties
Chemical formula	C_{14}H_{14}O_{2}
Molar mass	214.26 g/mol
- Except where otherwise noted, data are given for materials in their standard state (at 25 °C [77 °F], 100 kPa). Infobox references

Lunularin is a dihydrostilbenoid found in common celery. It has also been found in the roots of Hydrangea macrophylla.

A lunularic acid decarboxylase has been detected from the liverwort Conocephalum conicum. It converts lunularic acid into lunularin.
