= Dihydroxystilbene =

Dihydroxystilbene may refer to:

- 3,4′-Dihydroxystilbene, a stilbenoid found in the roots of Hydrangea macrophylla
- Pinosylvin (3,5-dihydroxystilbene), a pre-infectious stilbenoid toxin
- Stilbestrol (4,4'-dihydroxystilbene), a stilbenoid and parent of diethylstilbestrol (DES)
