= Mauvette =

Mauvette may refer to:

- a Hydrangea aspera variety
- Mauvette (character), a character associated with Demi the Demoness
