= Thunberginol E =

- Chemical structure of thunberginol E

Names
- IUPAC name (3R)-6,8-dihydroxy-3-(3-hydroxy-4-methoxyphenyl)-3,4-dihydroisochromen-1-one

Identifiers
CAS Number	147517-08-6
3D model (JSmol)	Interactive image
ChemSpider	57448109
PubChem CID	10040569
UNII	77N5TN6EJP
CompTox Dashboard (EPA)	DTXSID10745450
- InChI: InChI=1S/C16H14O6/c1-21-13-3-2-8(5-11(13)18)14-6-9-4-10(17)7-12(19)15(9)16(20)22-14/h2-5,7,14,17-19H,6H2,1H3 Key: MZKMQBPFGDJUFV-UHFFFAOYSA-N
- SMILES: COC1=C(C=C(C=C1)C2CC3=CC(=CC(=C3C(=O)O2)O)O)O

Properties
Chemical formula	C_{16}H_{14}O_{6}
Molar mass	302.27 g/mol
- Except where otherwise noted, data are given for materials in their standard state (at 25 °C [77 °F], 100 kPa). verify (what is ?) Infobox references

Thunberginol E is a dihydroisocoumarin found in Hydrangeae Dulcis Folium, the processed leaves of Hydrangea macrophylla var. thunbergii.
