= Thunberginol B =

- Chemical structure of thunberginol B

Names
- Preferred IUPAC name 3-(3,4-Dihydroxyphenyl)-6,8-dihydroxy-1H-2-benzopyran-1-one

Identifiers
CAS Number	147666-81-7
3D model (JSmol)	Interactive image
ChemSpider	4583010
PubChem CID	5473310
UNII	D2866L3MW5
CompTox Dashboard (EPA)	DTXSID90163774
- InChI: InChI=1S/C15H10O6/c16-9-3-8-5-13(7-1-2-10(17)11(18)4-7)21-15(20)14(8)12(19)6-9/h1-6,16-19H Key: NHFGEHLUROYMEB-UHFFFAOYSA-N
- SMILES: C1=CC(=C(C=C1C2=CC3=CC(=CC(=C3C(=O)O2)O)O)O)O

Properties
Chemical formula	C_{15}H_{10}O_{6}
Molar mass	286.23 g/mol
- Except where otherwise noted, data are given for materials in their standard state (at 25 °C [77 °F], 100 kPa). verify (what is ?) Infobox references

Thunberginol B is an isocoumarin found in Hydrangeae Dulcis Folium, the processed leaves of Hydrangea macrophylla var. thunbergii.
