= 6-Hydroxymellein =

- Chemical structure of (R)-6-hydroxymellein

Names
- Preferred IUPAC name (3R)-6,8-Dihydroxy-3-methyl-3,4-dihydro-1H-2-benzopyran-1-one
- Other names (R)-6-hydroxymellein (−)-6-Hydroxymellein

Identifiers
CAS Number	70901-60-9
3D model (JSmol)	Interactive image
ChemSpider	150838
KEGG	C02379
PubChem CID	172675
UNII	PUH8Z0Q805
CompTox Dashboard (EPA)	DTXSID90991190
- InChI: InChI=1S/C10H10O4/c1-5-2-6-3-7(11)4-8(12)9(6)10(13)14-5/h3-5,11-12H,2H2,1H3/t5-/m1/s1 Key: DHLPMLVSBRRUGA-RXMQYKEDSA-N
- SMILES: CC1CC2=CC(=CC(=C2C(=O)O1)O)O

Properties
Chemical formula	C_{10}H_{10}O_{4}
Molar mass	194.18 g/mol
- Except where otherwise noted, data are given for materials in their standard state (at 25 °C [77 °F], 100 kPa). Infobox references

6-Hydroxymellein is a dihydroisocoumarin, a phenolic compound found in carrots. It has also been isolated in Aspergillus terreus and shows an inhibition of pollen development in Arabidopsis thaliana.

== Biosynthesis ==
6-Methoxymellein is formed from S-adenosyl methionine and 6-hydroxymellein by the enzyme 6-hydroxymellein O-methyltransferase with secondary production of S-adenosylhomocysteine.
