= Thunberginol F =

- Chemical structure of thunberginol F

Names
- IUPAC name (3Z)-3-[(3,4-Dihydroxyphenyl)methylidene]-7-hydroxy-2-benzofuran-1-one

Identifiers
CAS Number	147666-82-8
3D model (JSmol)	Interactive image
ChemSpider	26233366
PubChem CID	6439493
UNII	2PA68RH5E6
CompTox Dashboard (EPA)	DTXSID501029763
- InChI: InChI=1S/C15H10O5/c16-10-5-4-8(6-12(10)18)7-13-9-2-1-3-11(17)14(9)15(19)20-13/h1-7,16-18H/b13-7+ Key: CFXQRFYFWXTZOJ-NTUHNPAUSA-N
- SMILES: c1cc\2c(c(c1)O)C(=O)O/C2=C/c3ccc(c(c3)O)O

Properties
Chemical formula	C_{15}H_{10}O_{5}
Molar mass	270.240 g·mol^{−1}
- Except where otherwise noted, data are given for materials in their standard state (at 25 °C [77 °F], 100 kPa). verify (what is ?) Infobox references

Thunberginol F is a phthalide found in Hydrangea macrophylla.
