= Thunberginol D =

- Chemical structure of thunberginol D

Names
- IUPAC name 3-(3,4-dihydroxyphenyl)-6,8-dihydroxy-3,4-dihydroisochromen-1-one

Identifiers
CAS Number	147517-07-5
3D model (JSmol)	Interactive image
ChemSpider	164167
PubChem CID	188928
UNII	JJX5KK3ZKU
CompTox Dashboard (EPA)	DTXSID50933137
- InChI: InChI=1S/C15H12O6/c16-9-3-8-5-13(7-1-2-10(17)11(18)4-7)21-15(20)14(8)12(19)6-9/h1-4,6,13,16-19H,5H2 Key: NNFSGOSBNORREV-UHFFFAOYSA-N
- SMILES: c1cc(c(cc1C2Cc3cc(cc(c3C(=O)O2)O)O)O)O

Properties
Chemical formula	C_{15}H_{12}O_{6}
Molar mass	288.25 g/mol
- Except where otherwise noted, data are given for materials in their standard state (at 25 °C [77 °F], 100 kPa). verify (what is ?) Infobox references

Thunberginol D is a dihydroisocoumarin found in Hydrangeae Dulcis Folium, the processed leaves of Hydrangea macrophylla var. thunbergii.
