= Hydrangeic acid =

Names
- Preferred IUPAC name 2-Hydroxy-6-[(E)-2-(4-hydroxyphenyl)ethen-1-yl]benzoic acid

Identifiers
CAS Number	491-79-2
3D model (JSmol)	Interactive image
ChEMBL	ChEMBL248347
ChemSpider	4476740
PubChem CID	5318116
UNII	GYE4WJ5J43
CompTox Dashboard (EPA)	DTXSID201045314
- InChI: InChI=1S/C15H12O4/c16-12-8-5-10(6-9-12)4-7-11-2-1-3-13(17)14(11)15(18)19/h1-9,16-17H,(H,18,19)/b7-4+ Key: UWXXIBUTKVUHTR-QPJJXVBHSA-N; InChI=1/C15H12O4/c16-12-8-5-10(6-9-12)4-7-11-2-1-3-13(17)14(11)15(18)19/h1-9,16-17H,(H,18,19)/b7-4+ Key: UWXXIBUTKVUHTR-QPJJXVBHBH
- SMILES: Oc2ccc(cc2)\C=C\c(c1C(O)=O)cccc1O

Properties
Chemical formula	C_{15}H_{12}O_{4}
Molar mass	256.257 g·mol^{−1}
- Except where otherwise noted, data are given for materials in their standard state (at 25 °C [77 °F], 100 kPa). Infobox references

Hydrangeic acid is a stilbenoid found in the leaves of Hydrangea macrophylla.

Hydrangeic acid is being investigated as a possible antidiabetic drug as it significantly lowered blood glucose, triglyceride and free fatty acid levels in laboratory animals.

== See also ==
- Lunularic acid, the corresponding dihydrostilbenoid also found in H. macrophylla
