= Lunularic acid decarboxylase =

Lunularic acid decarboxylase is an enzyme that converts lunularic acid into lunularin.

A lunularic acid decarboxylase has been detected from the liverwort Conocephalum conicum.
