= 6-hydroxymellein O-methyltransferase =

Class of enzymes

Identifiers
- EC no.: 2.1.1.108
- CAS no.: 124149-02-6

Databases
- IntEnz: IntEnz view
- BRENDA: BRENDA entry
- ExPASy: NiceZyme view
- KEGG: KEGG entry
- MetaCyc: metabolic pathway
- PRIAM: profile
- PDB structures: RCSB PDB PDBe PDBsum
- Gene Ontology: AmiGO / QuickGO
Search
- PMC: articles
- PubMed: articles
- NCBI: proteins

6-hydroxymellein O-methyltransferase (EC 2.1.1.108) is an enzyme that catalyzes the chemical reaction

(R)-6-hydroxymellein
+ SAM
(R)-6-methoxymellein
+ SAH

This is a methylation reaction in which the dihydroisocoumarin, (R)-6-hydroxymellein, is converted to the phytoalexin, (R)-6-methoxymellein. The methyl group comes from the cofactor, S-adenosyl methionine (SAM), which becomes S-adenosyl-L-homocysteine (SAH). The enzyme was characterised from carrots.

This enzyme belongs to the family of transferases, specifically those transferring one-carbon group methyltransferases. The systematic name of this enzyme class is S-adenosyl-L-methionine:6-hydroxymellein 6-O-methyltransferase. This enzyme is also called 6-hydroxymellein methyltransferase.
