= 6-Methoxymellein =

- Chemical structure of 6-Methoxymellein

Names
- Preferred IUPAC name 8-Hydroxy-6-methoxy-3-methyl-3,4-dihydro-1H-2-benzopyran-1-one
- Other names 8-Hydroxy-6-methoxy-3-methylisochroman-1-one

Identifiers
CAS Number	13410-15-6
3D model (JSmol)	Interactive image
ChemSpider	83993
PubChem CID	93040
UNII	424N0263W4
- InChI: InChI=1S/C11H12O4/c1-6-3-7-4-8(14-2)5-9(12)10(7)11(13)15-6/h4-6,12H,3H2,1-2H3 Key: AIFNAMVERSBWPS-UHFFFAOYSA-N; InChI=1/C11H12O4/c1-6-3-7-4-8(14-2)5-9(12)10(7)11(13)15-6/h4-6,12H,3H2,1-2H3 Key: AIFNAMVERSBWPS-UHFFFAOYAL
- SMILES: COc1cc(O)c2C(=O)OC(C)Cc2c1

Properties
Chemical formula	C_{11}H_{12}O_{4}
Molar mass	208.21 g/mol
- Except where otherwise noted, data are given for materials in their standard state (at 25 °C [77 °F], 100 kPa). Infobox references

6-Methoxymellein is a dihydroisocoumarin, a phenolic compound found in carrots and carrot purées. It is responsible for bitterness in carrots. It is a phytoalexin, induced in carrot slices by UV-C, that allows resistance to Botrytis cinerea and other microorganisms.

== Biosynthesis ==
6-Methoxymellein is formed from S-adenosyl methionine and 6-hydroxymellein by the enzyme 6-hydroxymellein O-methyltransferase with secondary production of S-adenosylhomocysteine.
