= Phyllodulcin =

- Chemical structure of phyllodulcin

Names
- Preferred IUPAC name (3R)-8-Hydroxy-3-(3-hydroxy-4-methoxyphenyl)-3,4-dihydro-1H-2-benzopyran-1-one
- Other names Praeruptorin

Identifiers
CAS Number	21499-23-0
3D model (JSmol)	Interactive image
ChemSpider	129391
PubChem CID	146694
UNII	9DDW04R41V
CompTox Dashboard (EPA)	DTXSID10944103
- InChI: InChI=1S/C16H14O5/c1-20-13-6-5-9(7-12(13)18)14-8-10-3-2-4-11(17)15(10)16(19)21-14/h2-7,14,17-18H,8H2,1H3/t14-/m1/s1 Key: PBILBHLAPJTJOT-CQSZACIVSA-N
- SMILES: COc1ccc(cc1O)[C@H]2Cc3cccc(c3C(=O)O2)O

Properties
Chemical formula	C_{16}H_{14}O_{5}
Molar mass	286.27 g/mol
- Except where otherwise noted, data are given for materials in their standard state (at 25 °C [77 °F], 100 kPa). verify (what is ?) Infobox references

Phyllodulcin is a dihydroisocoumarin found in Hydrangea macrophylla and Hydrangea serrata. It is a sweetener 400–800 times sweeter than sugar.

== See also ==
- Amacha
