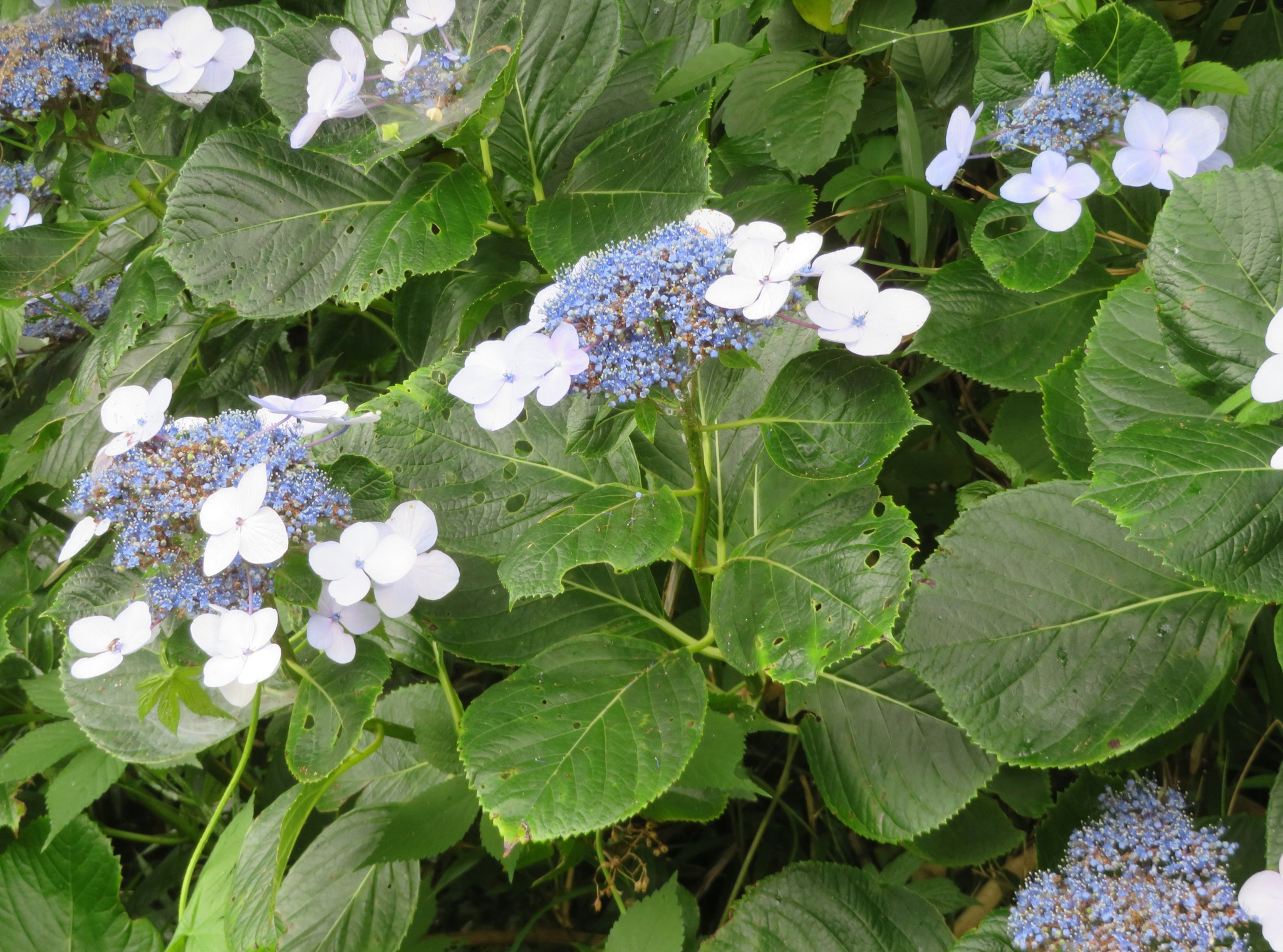
- Hydrangea macrophylla growing wild in Chiba Prefecture, Japan

Scientific classification
- Kingdom: Plantae
- Clade: Embryophytes
- Clade: Tracheophytes
- Clade: Angiosperms
- Clade: Eudicots
- Clade: Asterids
- Order: Cornales
- Family: Hydrangeaceae
- Genus: Hydrangea
- Species: H. macrophylla

Binomial name
- Hydrangea macrophylla (Thunb.) Ser.

Synonyms
- List: Hortensia japonica J.F.Gmel.; Hortensia macrophylla (Thunb.) H.Ohba & S.Akiyama; Hortensia mutabilis Schneev.; Hortensia nigra Carrière; Hortensia opuloides Lam.; Hortensia rosea Desf.; Hortensia speciosa Pers.; Hydrangea azisai Siebold; Hydrangea azisai var. foliis-aureovariegatis Siebold & Zucc.; Hydrangea cyanoclada G.Nicholson; Hydrangea florida Salisb.; Hydrangea hortensia Siebold; Hydrangea hortensis Sm.; Hydrangea japonica var. albovariegatis Van Houtte; Hydrangea japonica var. coerulescens Regel; Hydrangea japonica var. foliis-variegatis André; Hydrangea japonica f. hortensia Regel; Hydrangea japonica var. macrosepala Regel; Hydrangea japonica var. otaksa Regel; Hydrangea japonica var. plena Regel; Hydrangea japonica var. variegata (E.J.Lowe & W.Howard) Regel; Hydrangea macrocephala Dippel; Viburnum macrophyllum Thunb.

= Hydrangea macrophylla =

Species of flowering plant in the hydrangea family

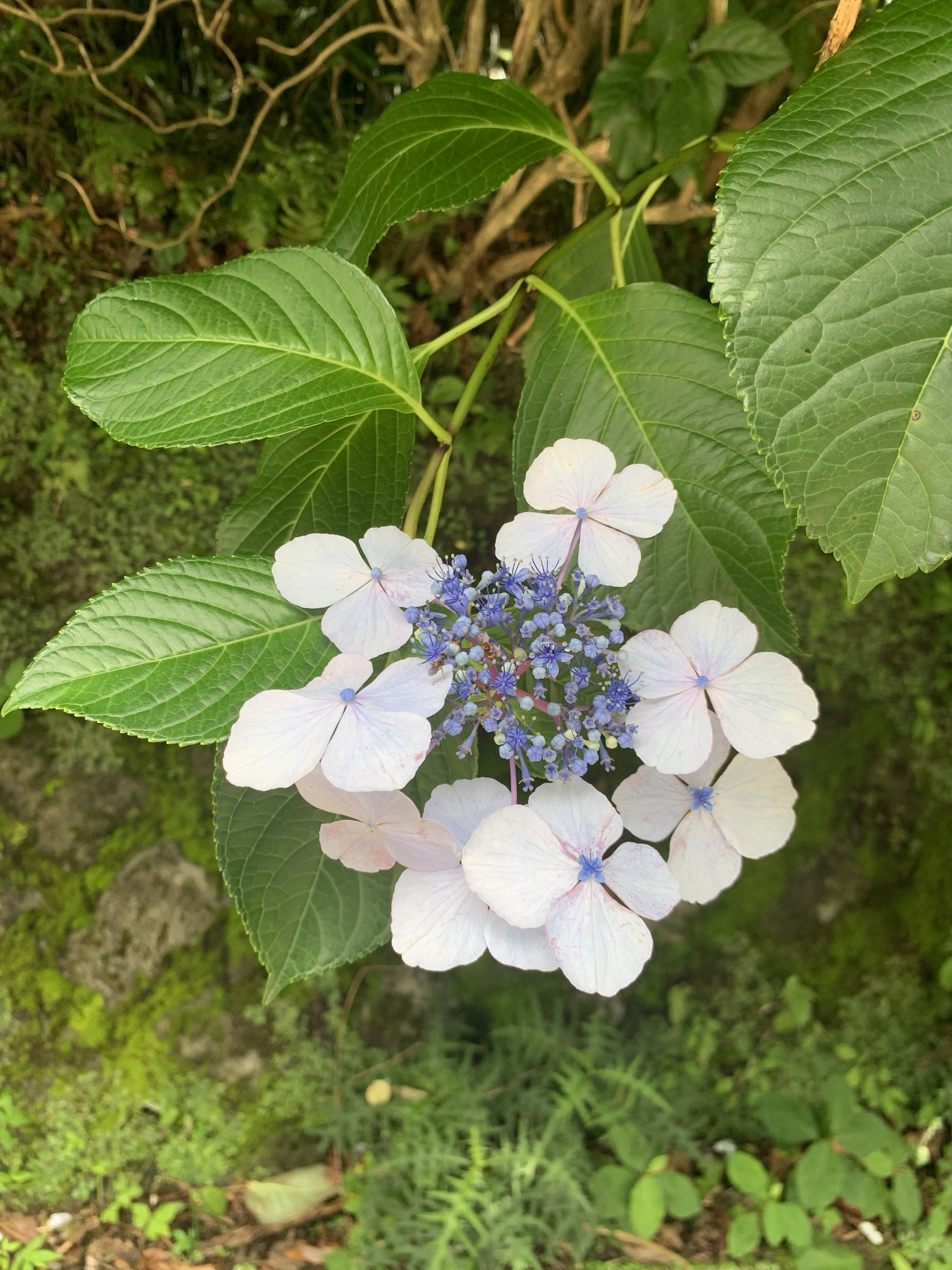
Close-up on a flowerhead showing the two flower types; Izu Ōshima, near Tokyo, Japan.

Hydrangea macrophylla is a species of flowering plant in the family Hydrangeaceae, native and endemic to Japan. It is a deciduous shrub growing to 3 m (10 ft) tall by 2.5 m (8 ft) or more broad with large heads of pink or blue flowers in summer and autumn. It is currently treated as monotypic, with no subspecies or varieties. Common names include bigleaf hydrangea, and, for particular cultivar groups, the names lacecap hydrangea, mophead hydrangea, and hortensia. It is widely cultivated in many parts of the world in many climates. It is not to be confused with H. aspera 'Macrophylla'.

== Distribution and habitat ==
Hydrangea macrophylla is endemic to Japan, where it occurs in coastal habitats from Honshu southwards. Natural wild plants, formerly sometimes distinguished as H. macrophylla var. normalis E.H.Wilson, have "lacecap" structure flowerheads, with a few large sterile showy bract-like flowers that act as targets for pollinators, surrounding a central cluster of small fertile flowers. A closely related hydrangea from the mountains of the interior of Japan, Hydrangea serrata, was treated as a variety of H. macrophylla by some authors in the past, but is currently treated as a separate species.

The species is naturalised in China, Korea, Siberia, New Zealand and the Americas, and has become an invasive species in the Azores and Madeira archipelagos.

== Description ==
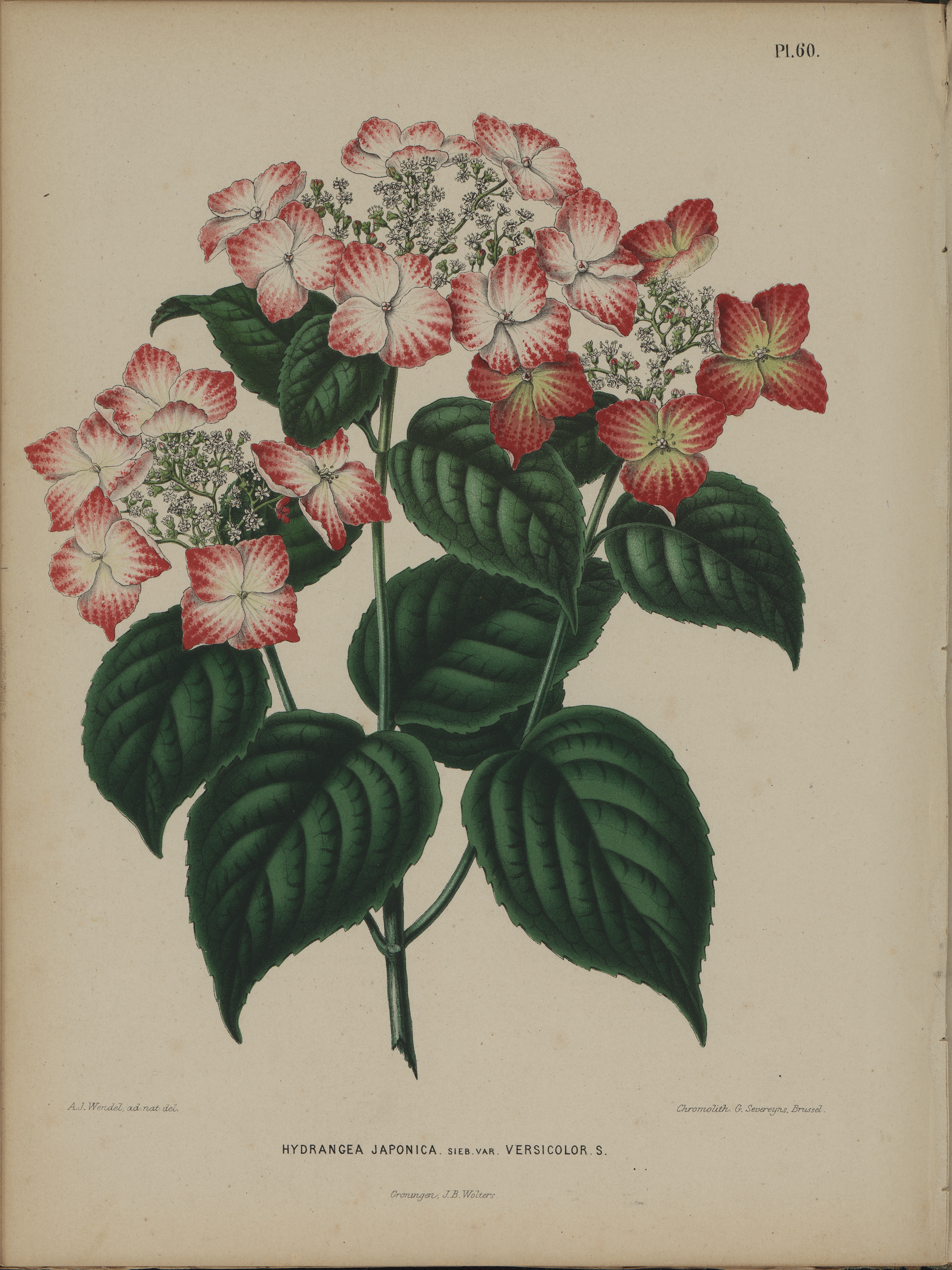
Hydrangea macrophylla by Abraham Jacobus Wendel, 1868

The term macrophylla means 'large- or long-leaved'. The opposite leaves can grow to 15 cm (6 in) in length. They are simple, membranous, orbicular to elliptic and acuminate. They are generally serrated.

The natural inflorescence of wild Hydrangea macrophylla is a corymb, with all flowers placed in a plane. Two distinct types of flowers are found; numerous central, small, fertile pentamerous ones, and a few peripheral, large, tetramerous ones; the latter are usually sterile, and whitish to pale blue or pinkish. The small flowers have five small greenish sepals and five small petals. Flowering begins in early summer and lasts until early winter. The fruit is a subglobose capsule. In cultivation as an ornamental plant, numerous variants have been developed as cultivars; in most of these (over 500 cultivars), the small central flowers replaced by large, sterile or mostly sterile tetramerous flowers, the inflorescence forming a hemisphere or a whole sphere rather than in a flat plane. These cultivar groups are known as "mophead" or "hortensia" hydrangeas. These large flowers have colours ranging from pale pink to red, fuchsia, purple, to blue. A much smaller cultivar group (over 20 cultivars), known as "lacecap" hydrangeas, retain the natural form of flat flowerheads with small flowers surrounded by a halo of large sterile flowers, but varying from the wild plants in more intense colours. Some cultivars (possibly many, and particularly those selected for greater cold tolerance) derive from hybrids between Hydrangea macrophylla and Hydrangea serrata, the hill hydrangea of the mountains of Japan.

== Colour and soil acidity ==
The flowers of Hydrangea macrophylla cultivars can be blue, red, pink, light purple, or dark purple. The colour is affected by soil pH. An acidic soil (pH below 7) will usually produce a flower colour closer to blue, whereas an alkaline soil (pH above 7) will produce flowers of a pink, or even a red colour. This is caused by a colour change of the flower pigments in the presence of aluminium ions which can be taken up into hyperaccumulating plants. Scientists do not understand why this happens, whether it is due to predation or to attract pollinators.

== Chemistry ==
Phyllodulcin, hydrangenol, and their 8-O-glucosides, and thunberginols A and F can be found in H. macrophylla. Thunberginol B, the dihydroisocoumarins thunberginol C, D and E, the dihydroisocoumarin glycosides thunberginol G 3'-O-glucoside and (−)-hydrangenol 4'-O-glucoside and four kaempferol and quercetin oligoglycosides can be found in Hydrangeae Dulcis Folium, the processed leaves of H. macrophylla var. thunbergii. The leaves also contain the stilbenoid hydrangeic acid.

The various colours, such as red, mauve, purple, violet and blue, in H. macrophylla are developed from one simple anthocyanin, delphinidin 3-glucoside (myrtillin), which forms complexes with metal ions called metalloanthocyanins.

Lunularic acid, lunularin, 3,4′-dihydroxystilbene and a glycoside of lunularic acid have been found in the roots of H. macrophylla.

Hydrangine is another name for the coumarin umbelliferone, and may be responsible for the possible toxicity of the plant.

== Uses ==
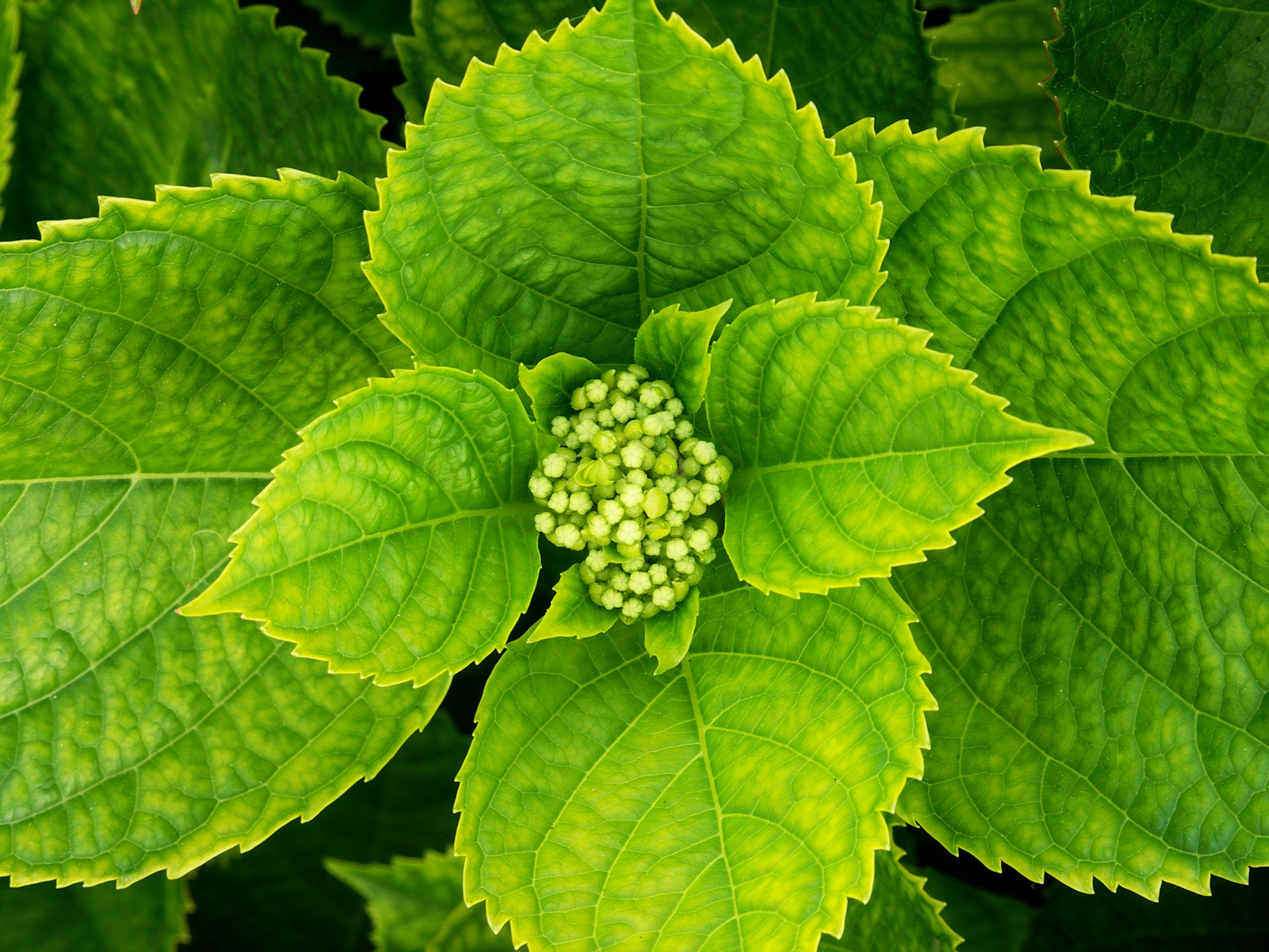
Bud and leaves

Amacha is a Japanese beverage made from fermented leaves of Hydrangea macrophylla var. thunbergii.

Hydrangeae Dulcis Folium is a drug made from the fermented and dried leaves of H. macrophylla var. thunbergii with possible antiallergic and antimicrobial properties. It also has a hepatoprotective activity by suppression of D-galactosamine-induced liver injury in vitro and in vivo.

Hydrangea macrophylla is included in the Tasmanian Fire Service's list of low flammability plants, indicating that it is suitable for growing within a building protection zone.

Leaf extracts of Hydrangea macrophylla are being investigated as a possible source of new chemical compounds with antimalarial activity. Hydrangeic acid from the leaves is being investigated as a possible anti-diabetic drug as it significantly lowered blood glucose, triglyceride, and free fatty acid levels in laboratory animals.

== Cultivars ==
The two main groups of H. macrophylla cultivars are called "lacecap" and "mophead".

Some popular hydrangea cultivars (those marked agm have gained the Royal Horticultural Society's Award of Garden Merit) include:

- 'All Summer Beauty'; cold-hardy, floriferous mophead
- 'Alpengluhen'; deep-red coloured mophead
- 'Altona' agm; compact plant with large rose-red florets
- 'Ami Pasquier' agm; floriferous, wine pink to blue mophead
- 'Ayesha'; small, cupped, lilac-like flowers in clusters
- 'Bailmer' (marketed as Endless Summer) a perpetual-blooming, pink to blue mophead
- 'Beauté Vendômoise'; giant whitish-pink lacecap
- 'Blaumeise' agm; Swiss-bred "Teller" blue lacecap
- 'Blue Bonnet'; hardy, blue mophead
- 'Blue Wave'; robust light pink to light blue lacecap
- 'Blushing Bride'; cold-hardy, ever-blooming white mophead
- 'Cocktail'; bushy shrub with ovate, serrated sepals
- 'Europa' agm; compact, deep pink mophead
- 'Forever Pink'; a pink mophead
- 'Générale Vicomtesse de Vibraye' agm; compact, cold-hardy, French-bred pink to blue mophead
- 'Hamburg'; deep-coloured pink to blue mophead
- 'Harlequin'; a picoteed pink to purple mophead
- 'Lady in Red'; large lacecap flowers of rose-red
- 'Lanarth White' agm; white lacecap
- 'Lilacina'; cold-hardy, disease-resistant pink to blue lacecap
- 'Love You Kiss' agm; red-margined white florets, lacecap
- 'Madame Emile Mouillère' agm; small shrub to 1.8 m (5.9 ft), white flowers
- 'Marechal Foch'; old-fashioned pink to blue mophead
- 'Mariesii Grandiflora'; blue or pink and white lacecap
- 'Mariesii Lilacina' agm; mauve pink or blue lacecap
- 'Mariesii Perfecta'; blue, or blue and pink, lacecap
- 'Masja'; bushy and compact, dark pink to pink mophead
- 'Möwe'; rose-red and cream lacecap
- 'Nigra'; pink or blue mophead, black stems
- 'Nikko Blue'; popular, cold-hardy pink to blue mophead
- 'Pia'; dwarf pink to purplish-blue mophead
- 'Penny Mac'; cold-hardy, pink to blue mophead
- 'Rotschwantz’ agm; deep red and white lacecap
- 'Soeur Therese'; hardy, robust white mophead
- 'Taube'; Swiss-bred "Teller", pink to blue lacecap
- 'Tokyo Delight' agm; mauve-pink and white lacecap
- 'Twist-N-Shout'; ever-blooming, hardy pink to blue lacecap
- 'Veitchii' agm; blue and white lacecap
- 'Westfalen' agm; compact, crimson-purple mophead
- 'Zorro’ agm; agm bright blue lacecap

== Gallery ==
Lacecaps

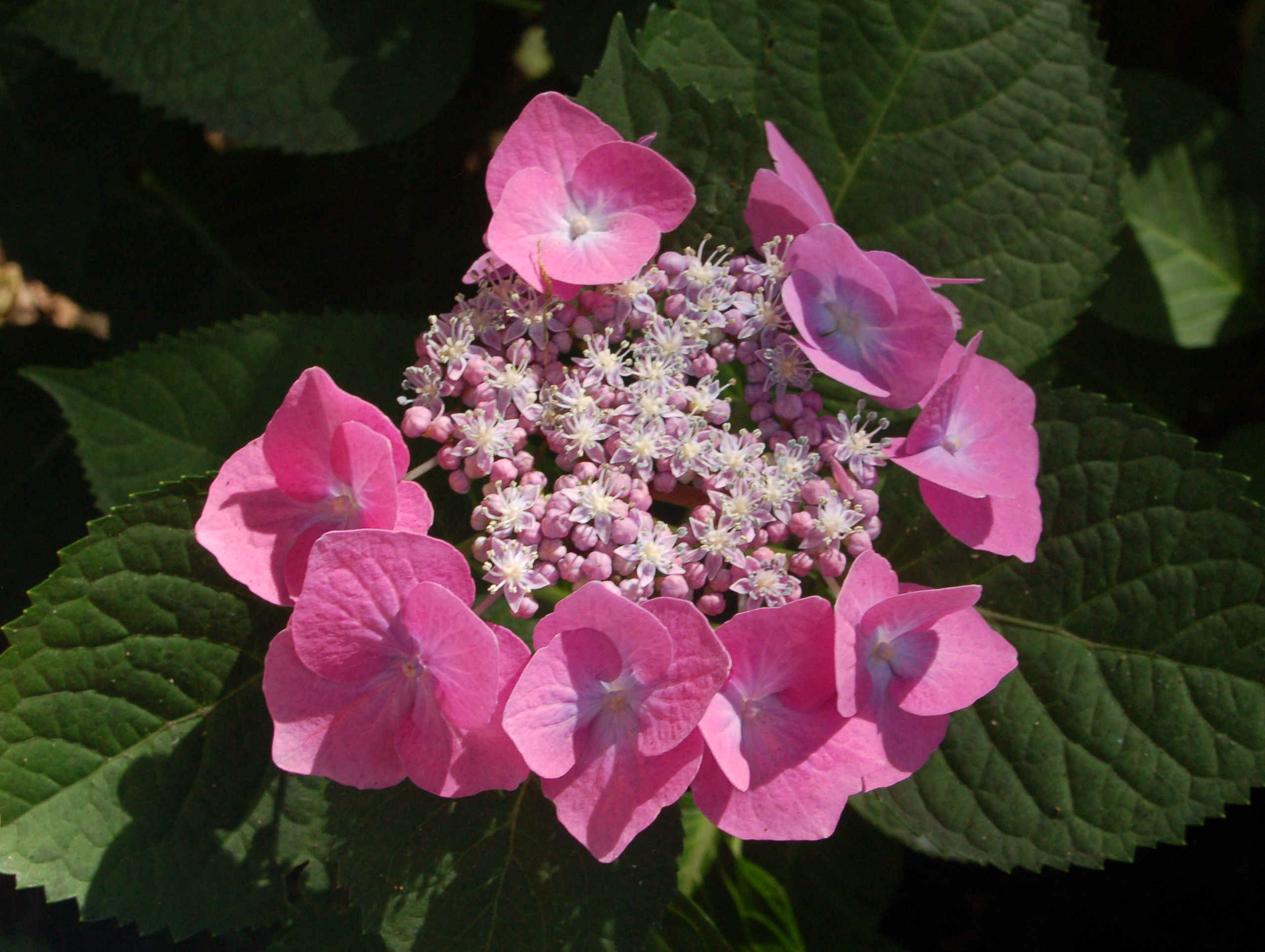
'Buntspecht'

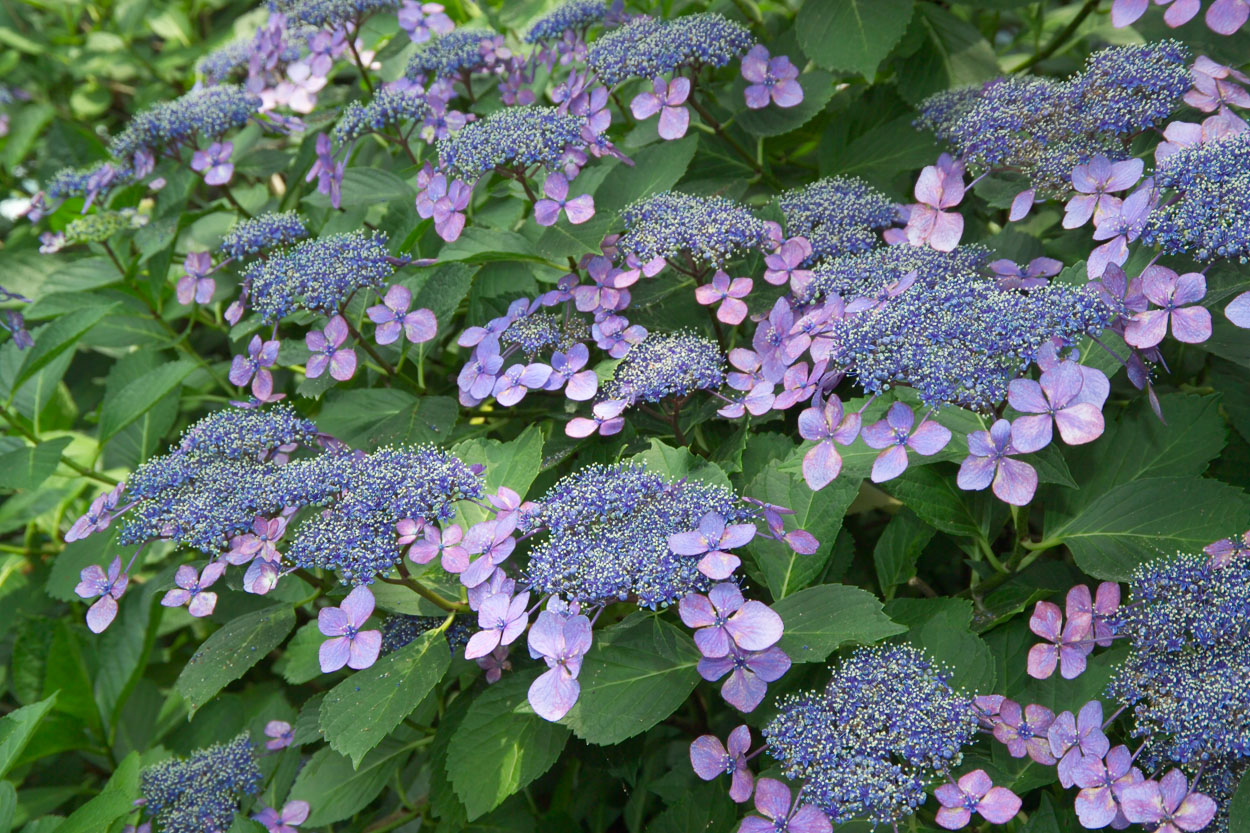
'Gakuajisai'

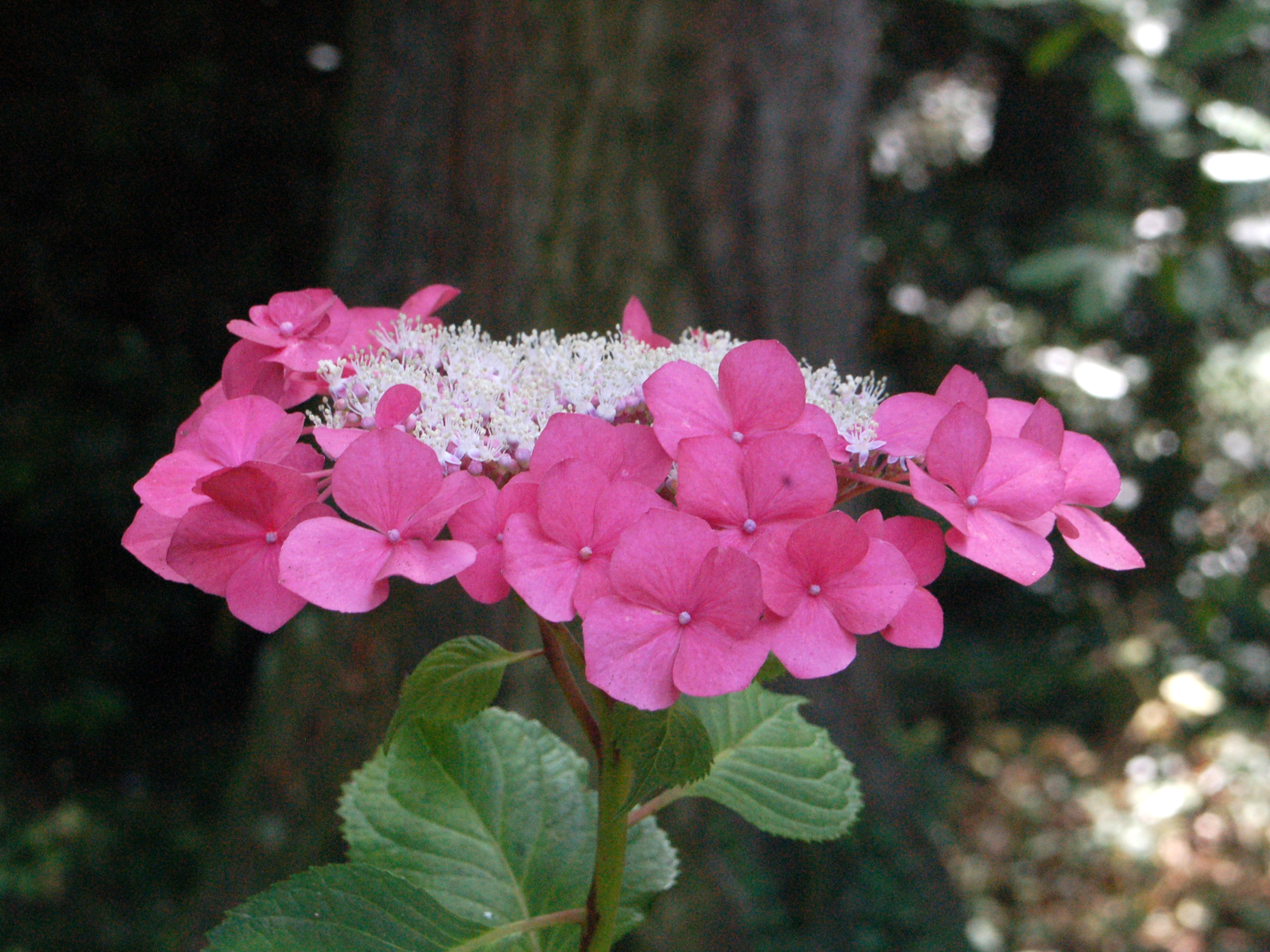
'Geoffrey Chadbund'

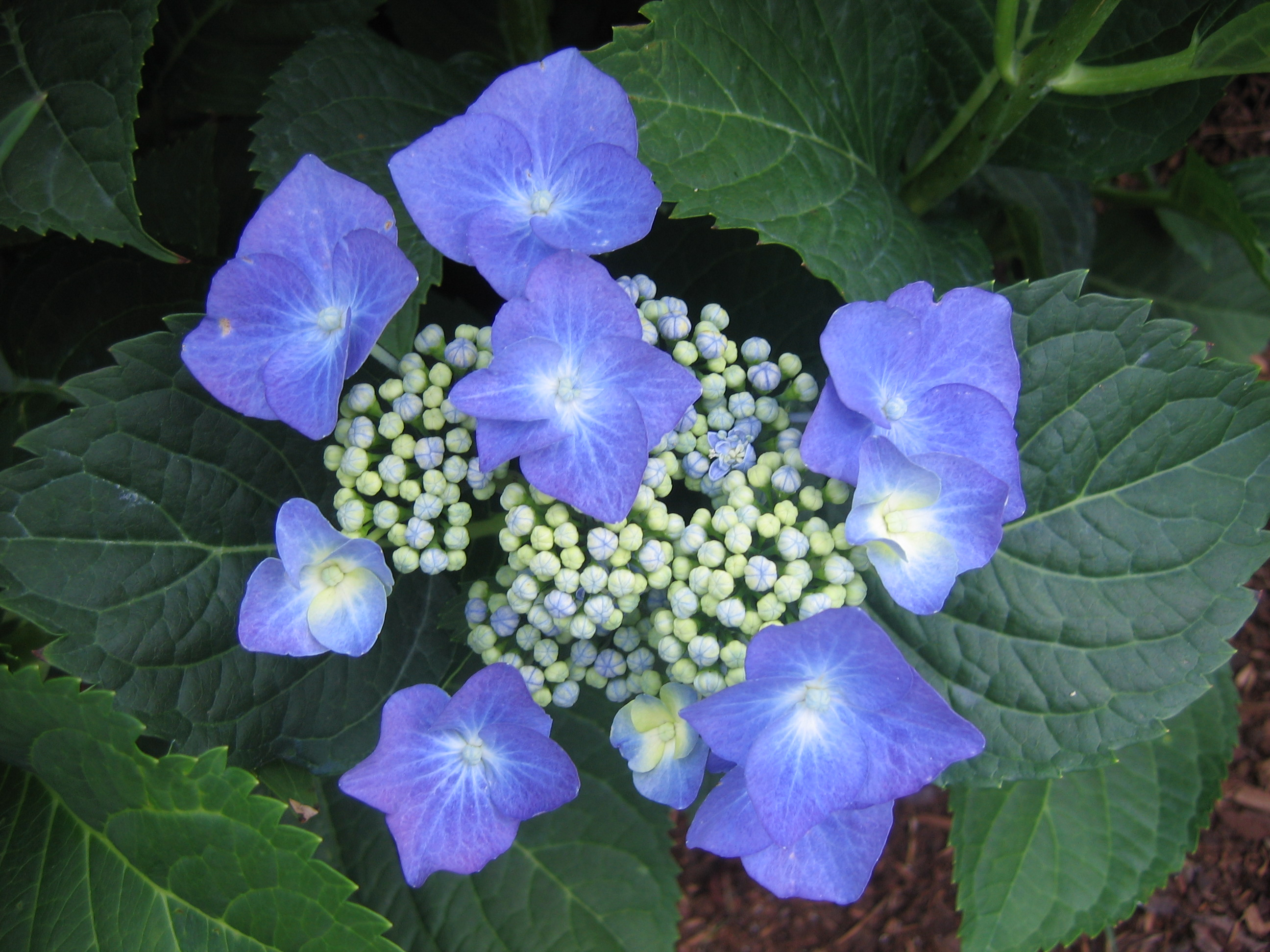
'Taube'

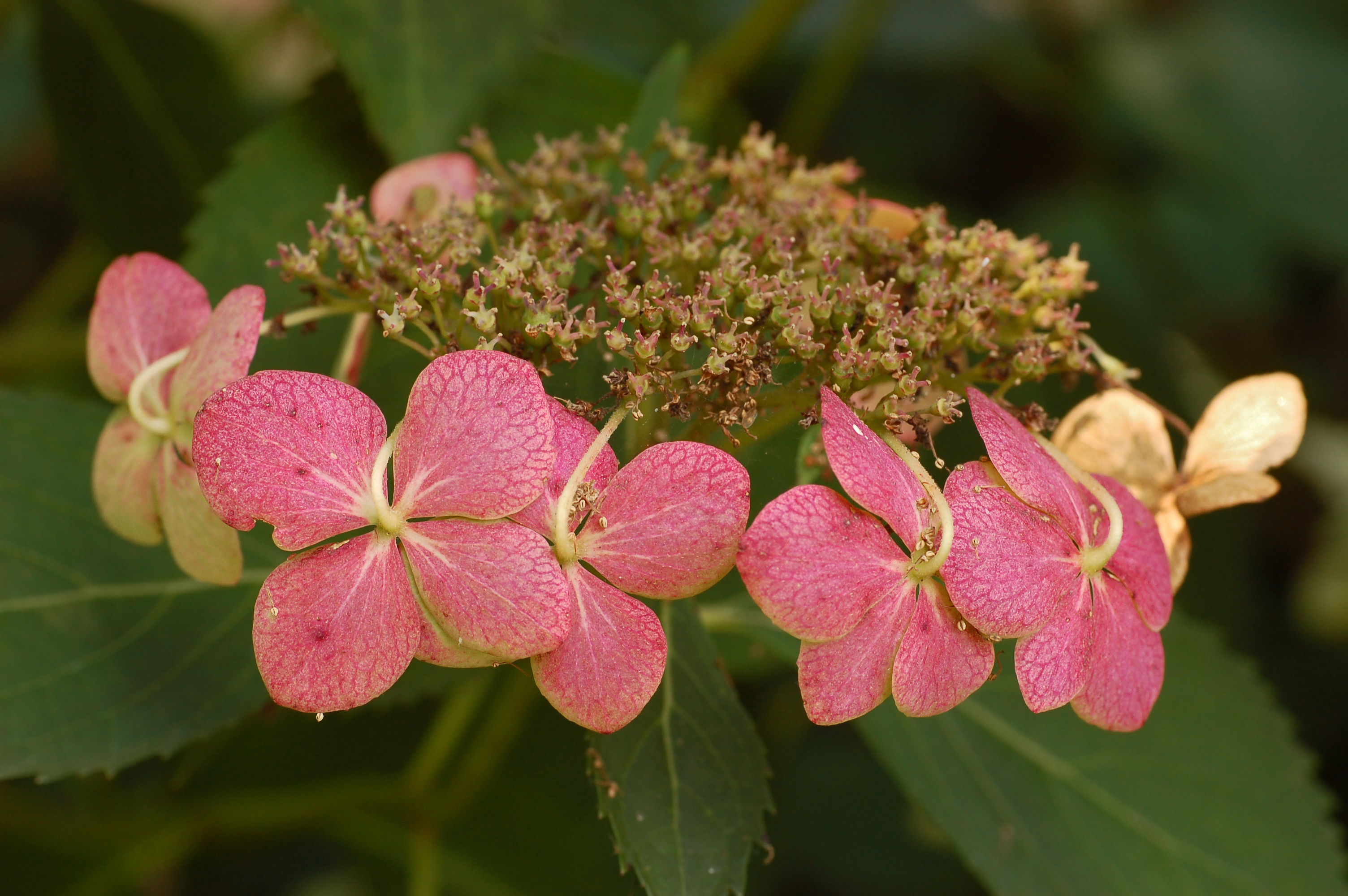
'Tokyo Delight'

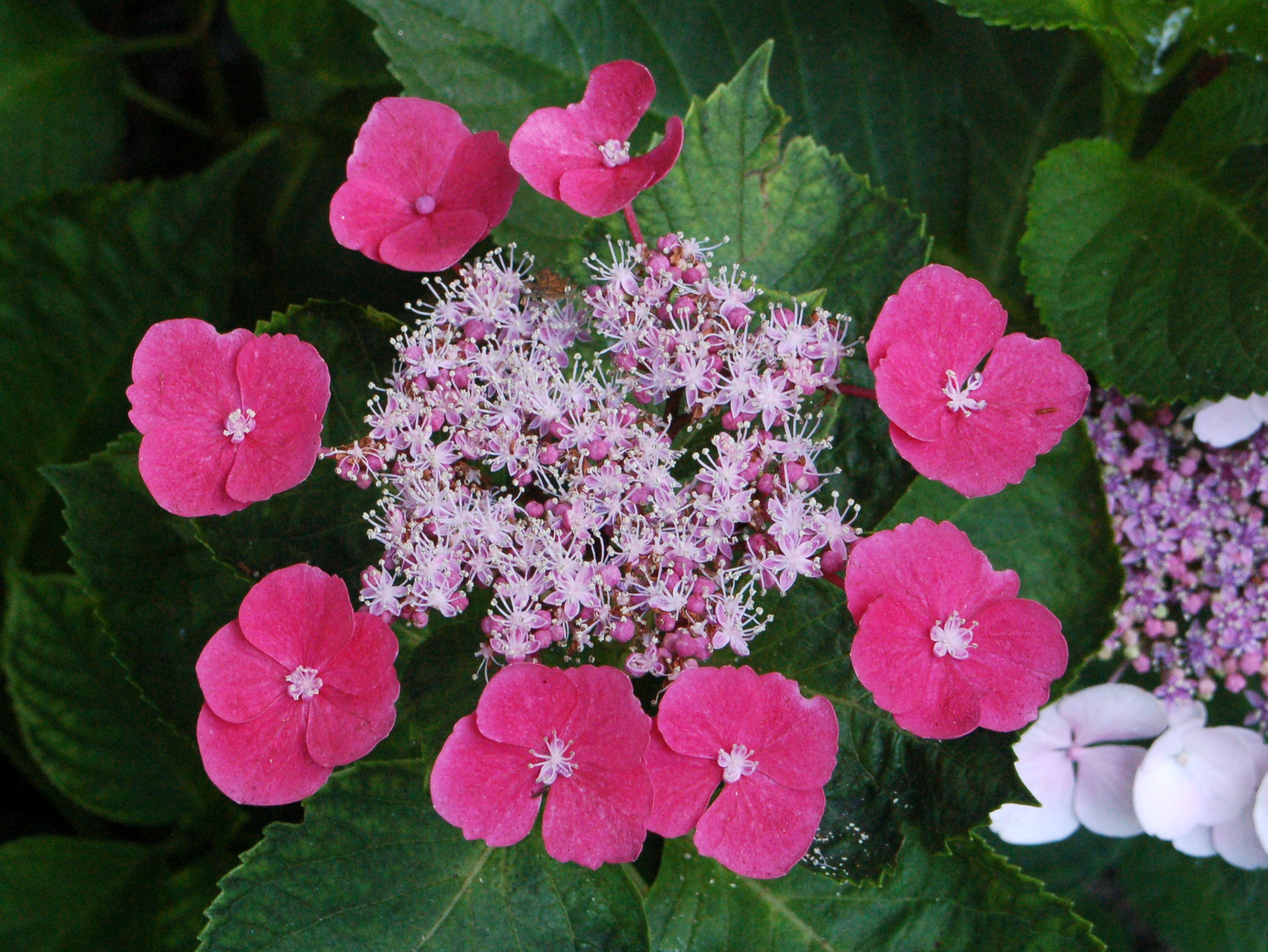
'Zaunkoenig'

Mopheads (also called hortensias)

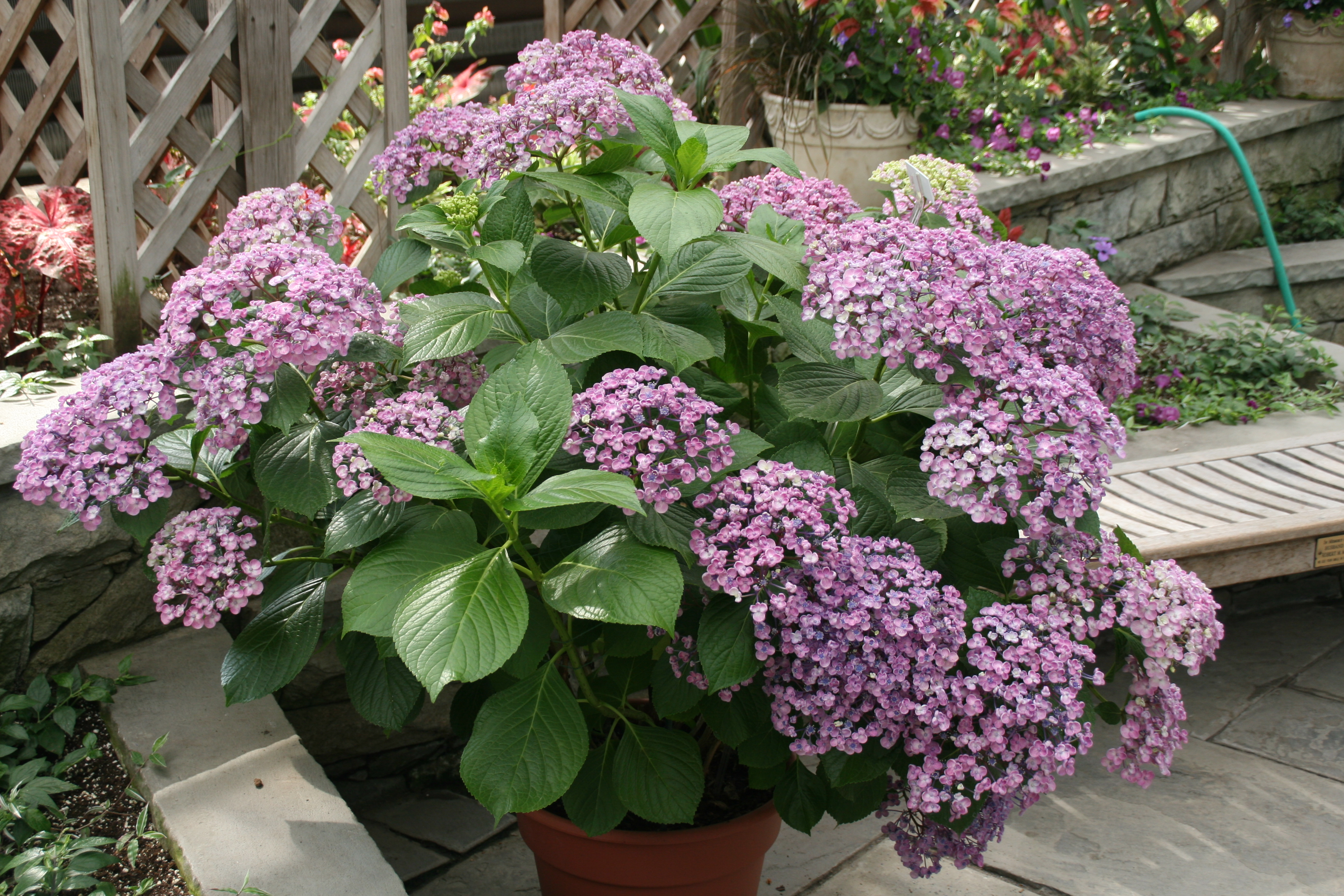
'Ayesha'

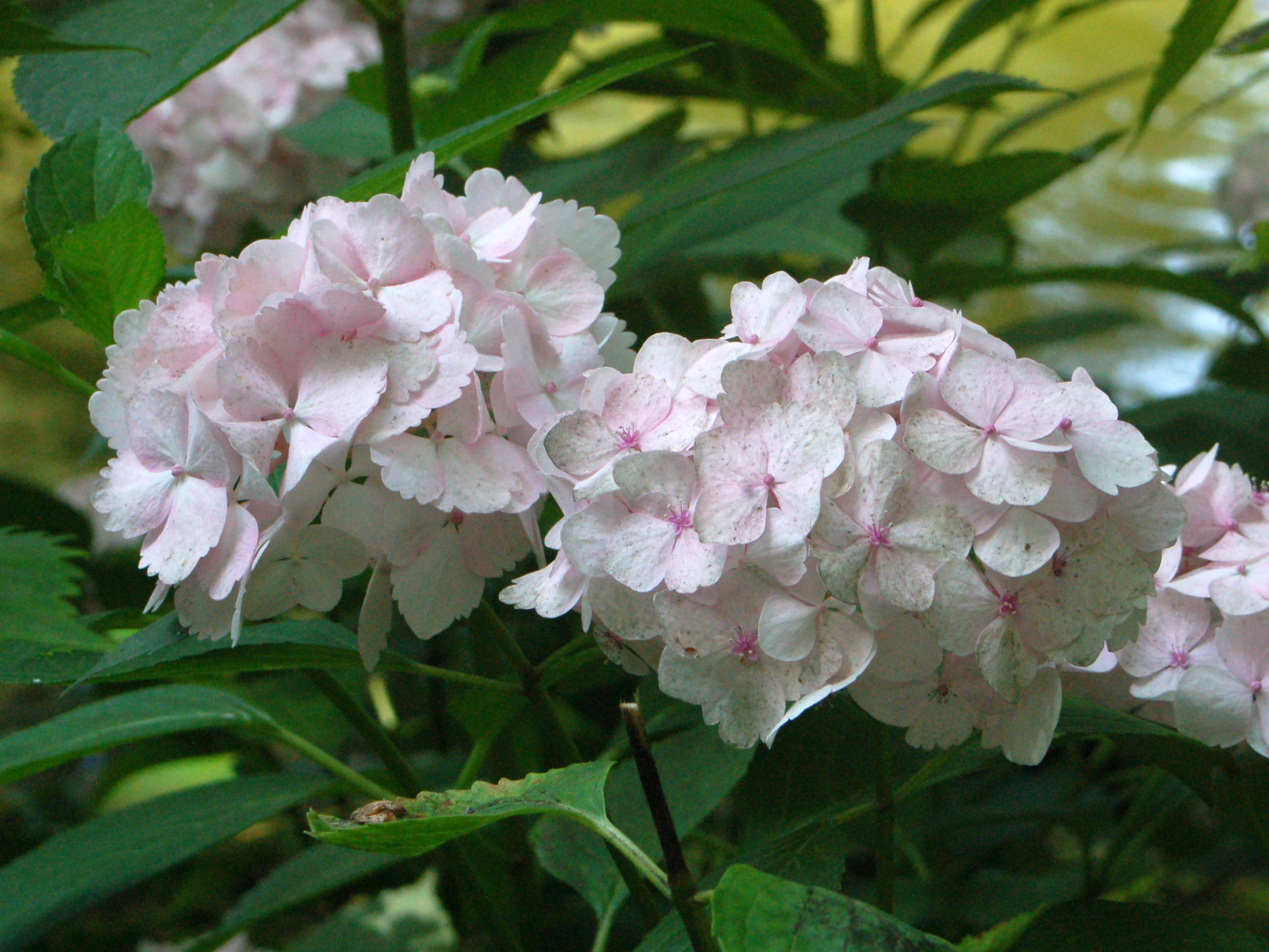
'Beauté Vendomoise'

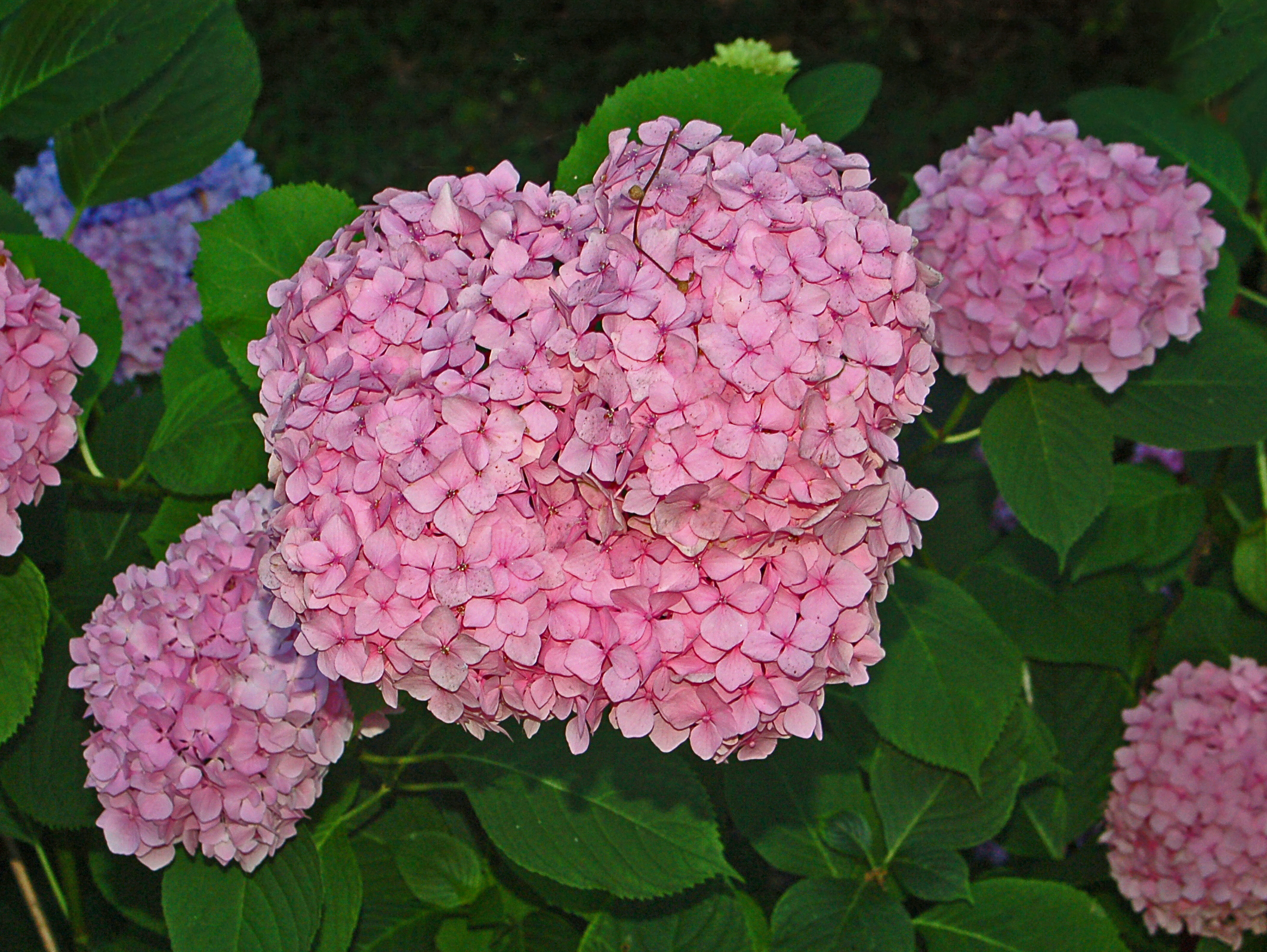
'Harlequin'

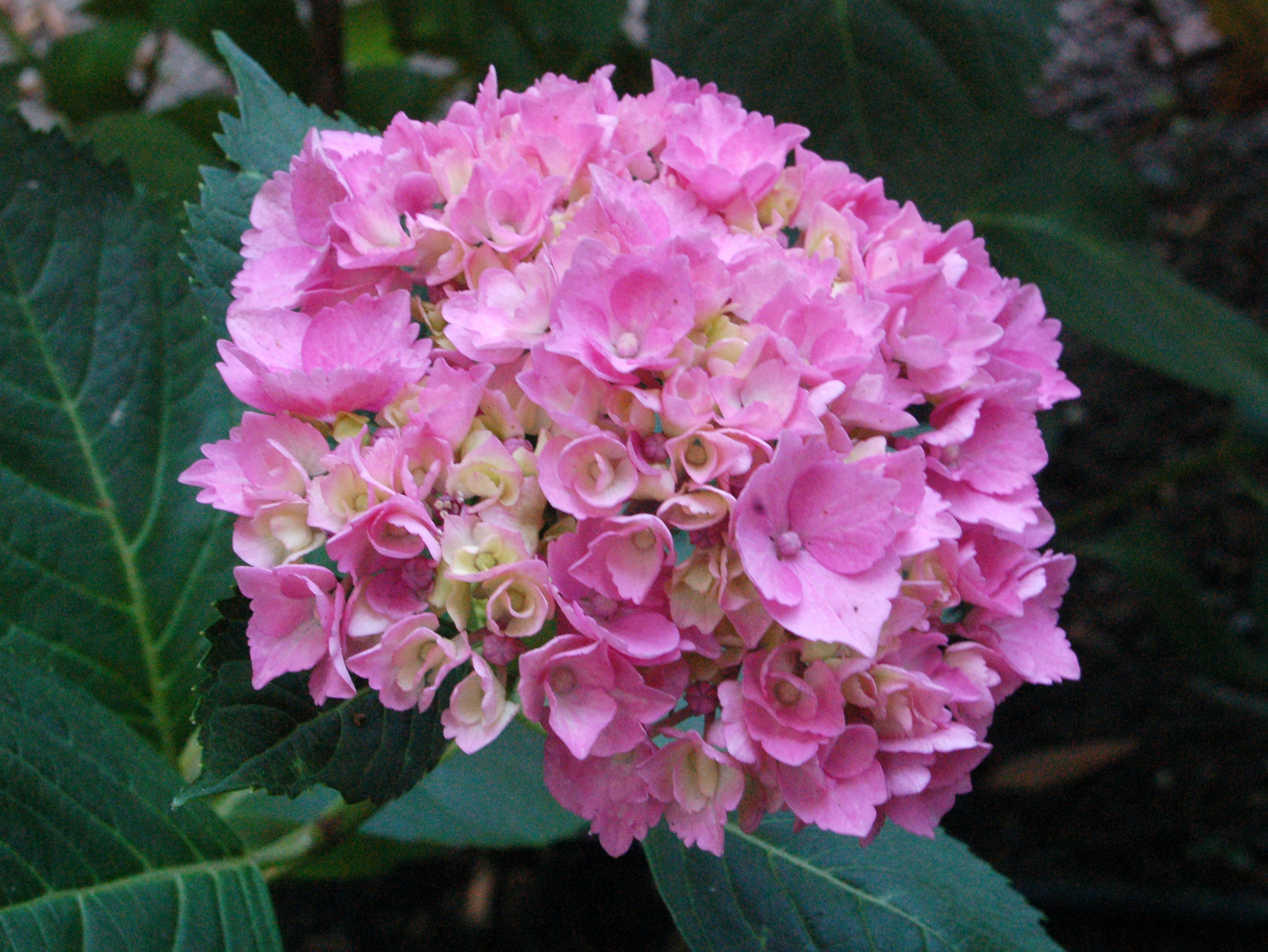
'La Marne'

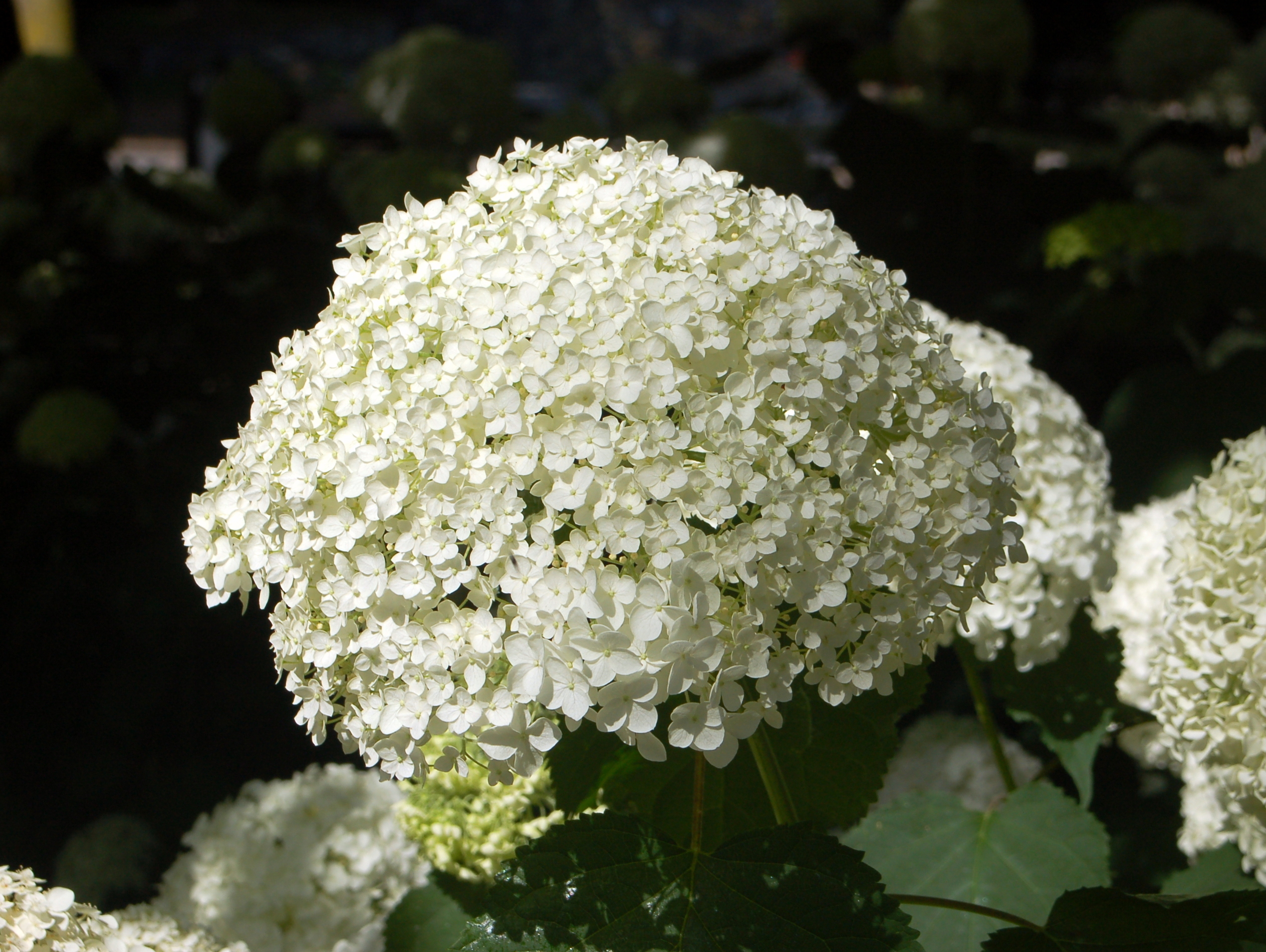
'Mariesii'

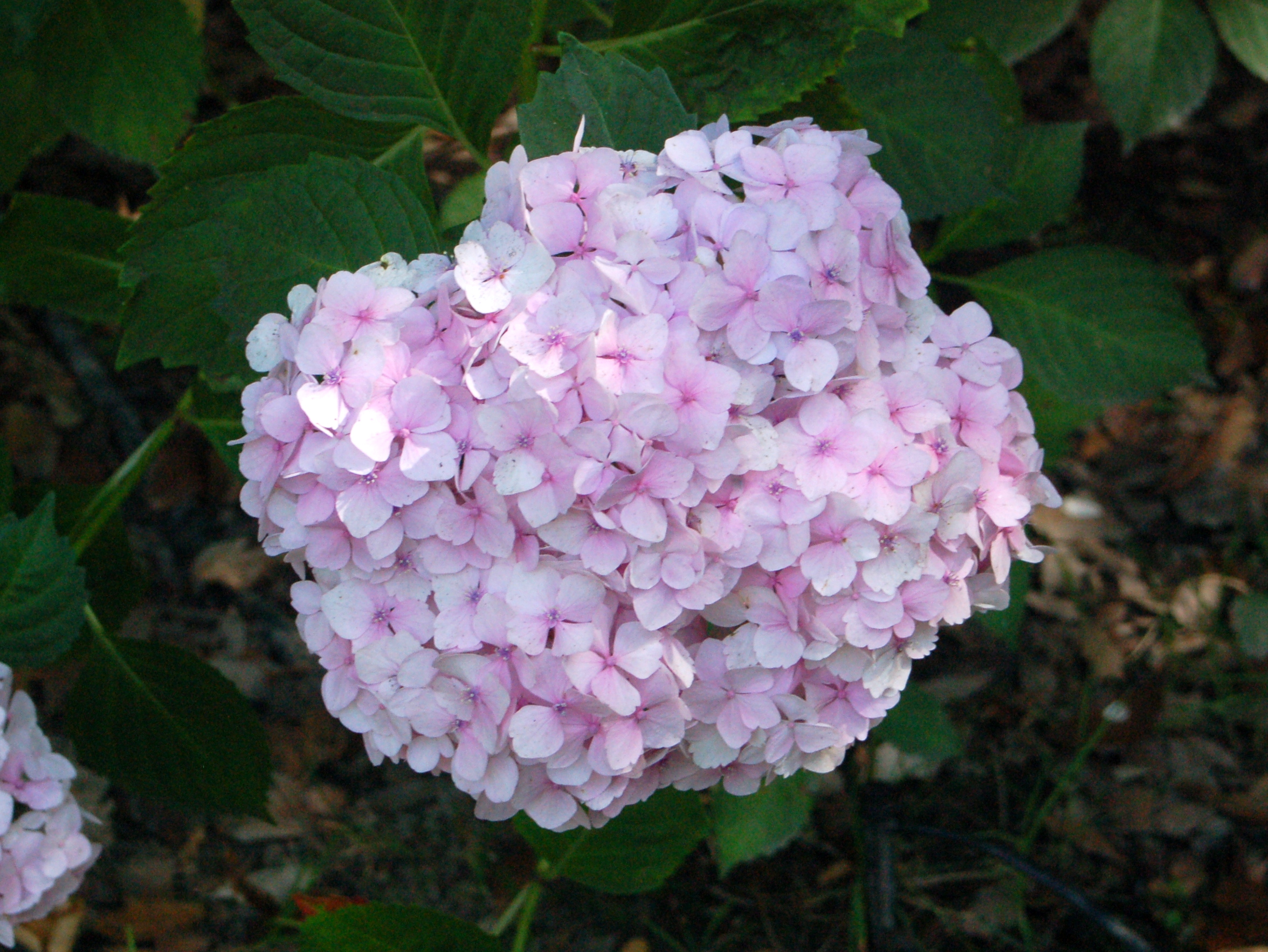
'Merveille'

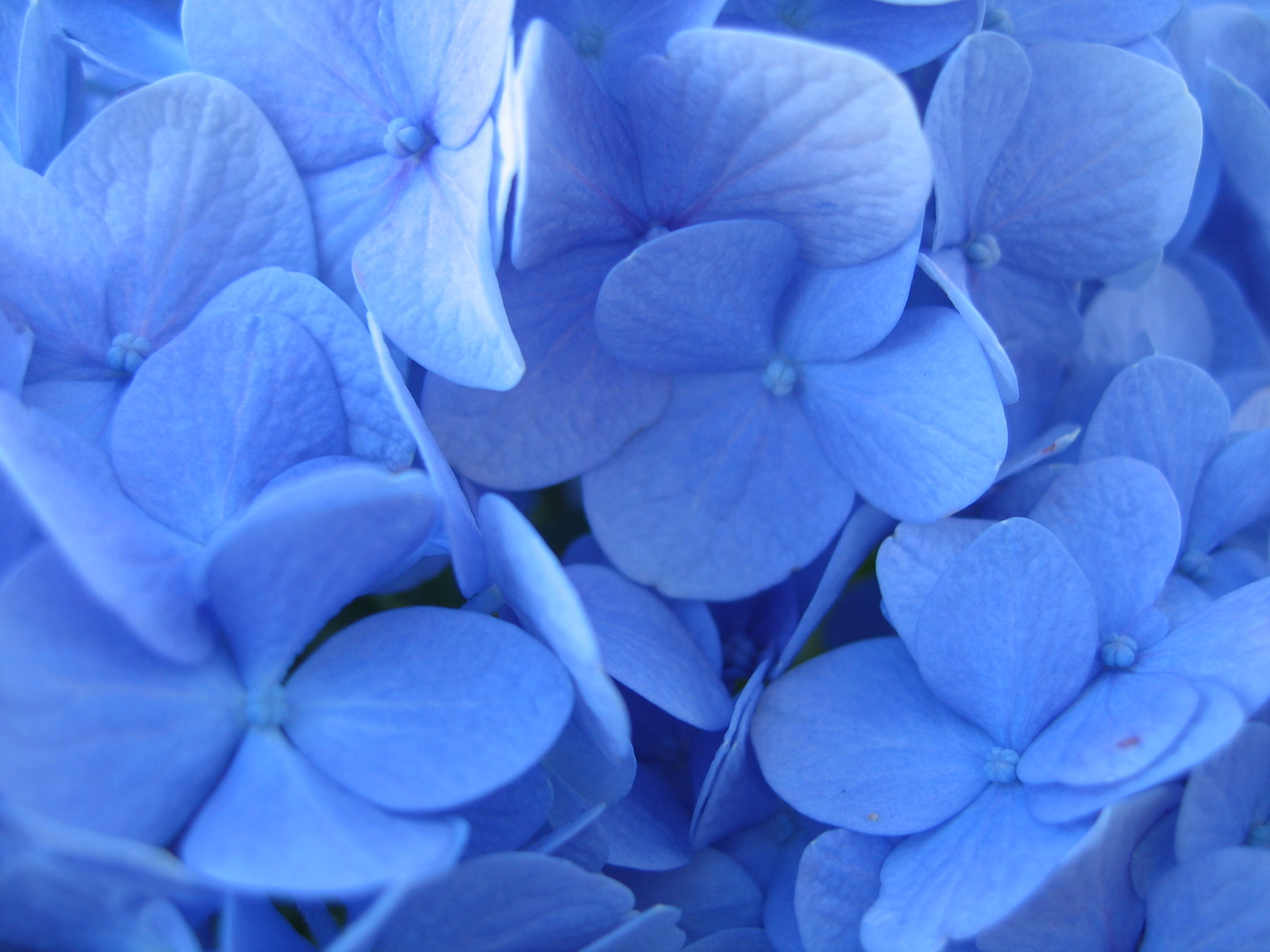
'Nikko Blue'

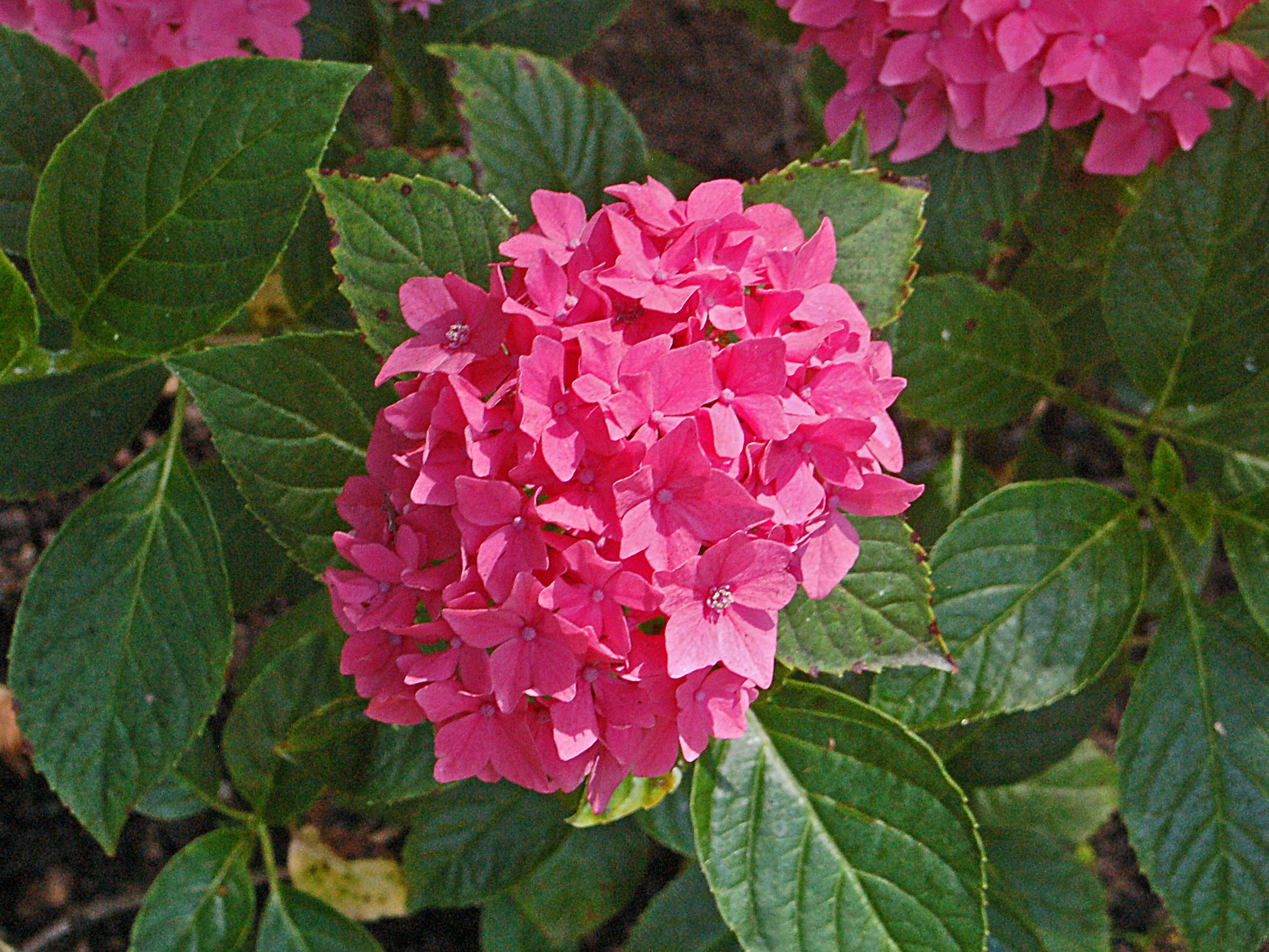
'Pia'

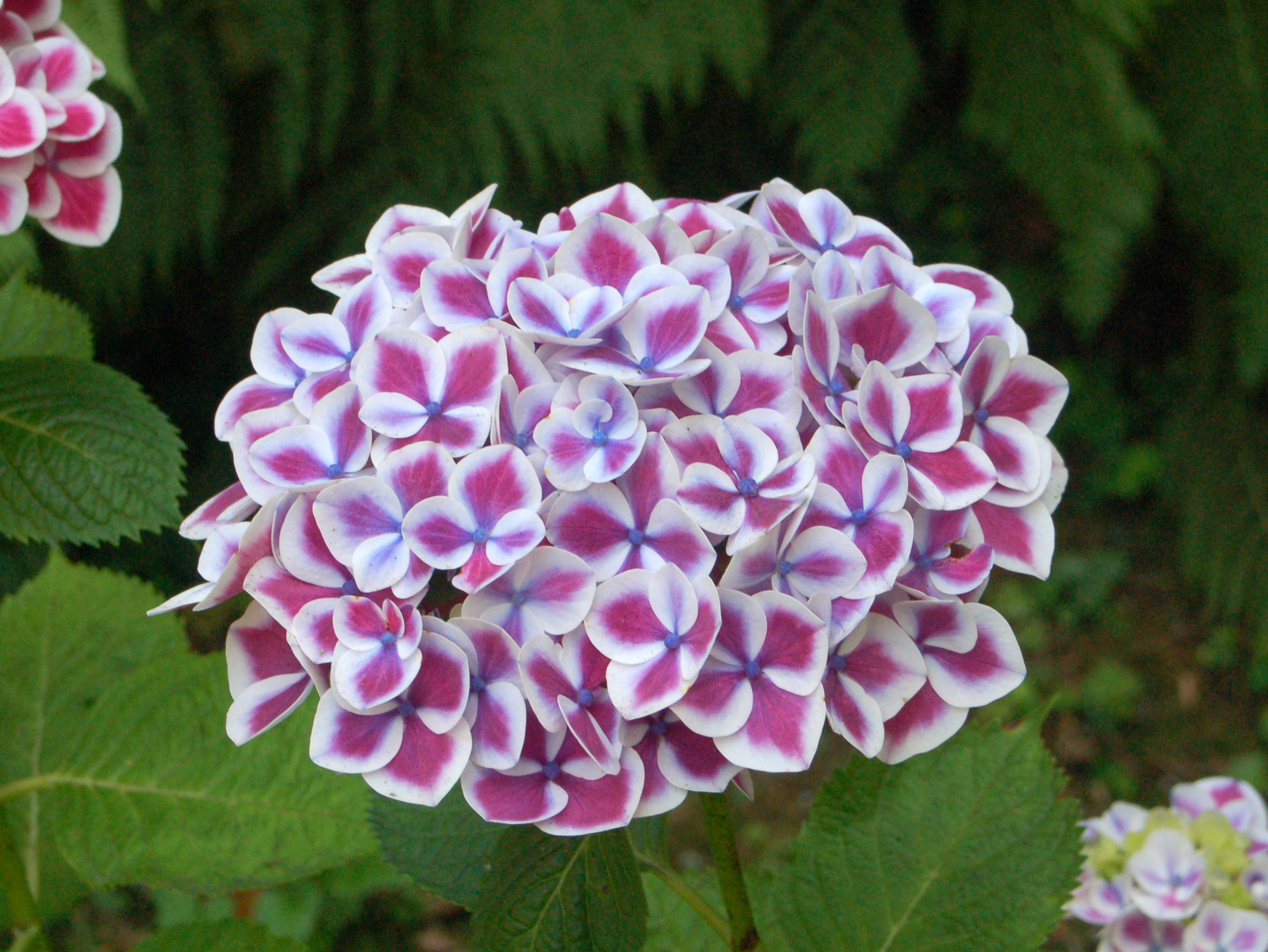
'Red Ace'

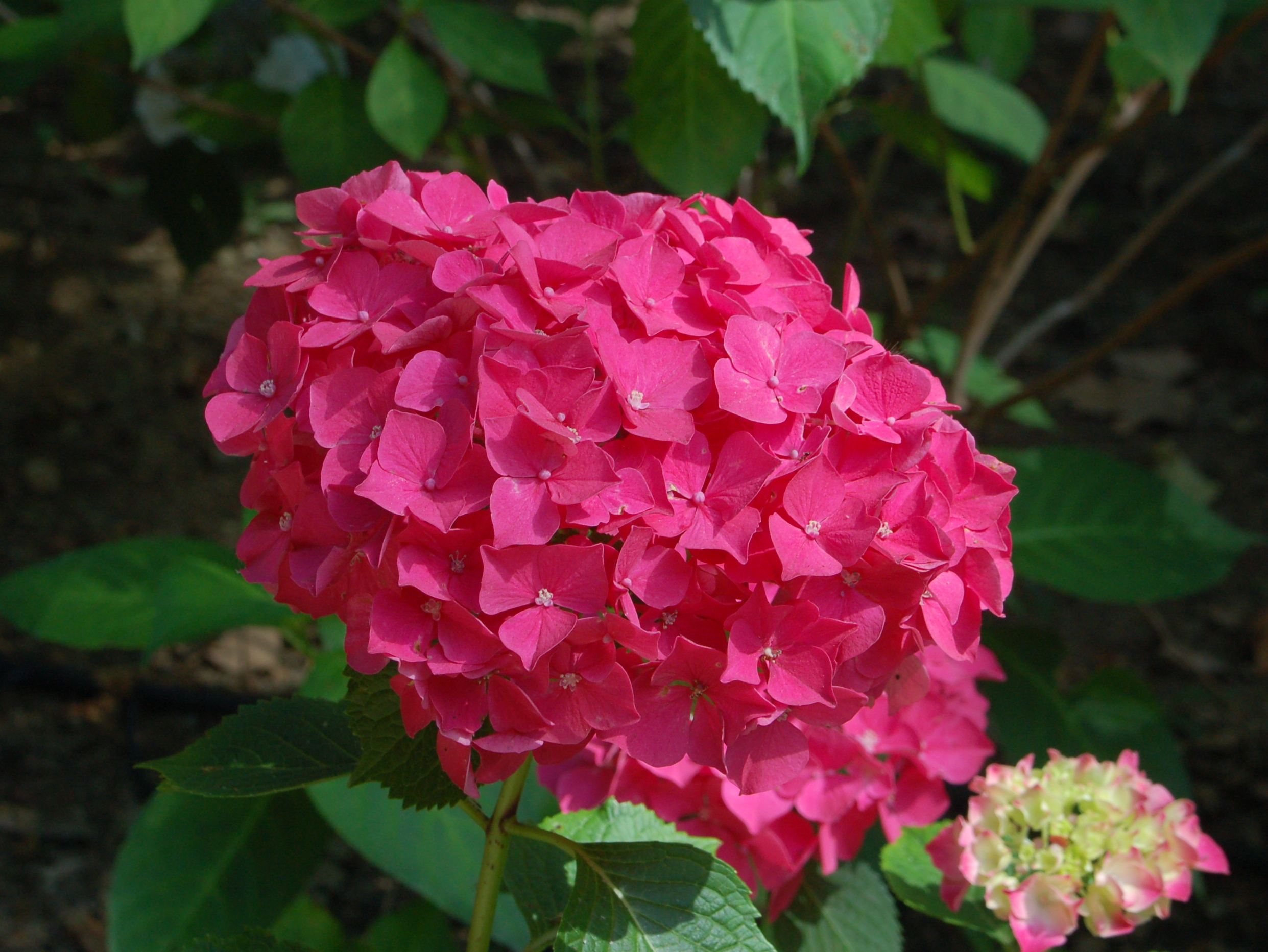
'Satinette'
