= Thunberginol A =

- Chemical structure of thunberginol A

Names
- Preferred IUPAC name 3-(3,4-Dihydroxyphenyl)-8-hydroxy-1H-2-benzopyran-1-one

Identifiers
CAS Number	147666-80-6
3D model (JSmol)	Interactive image
ChemSpider	4479556
PubChem CID	5321948
UNII	WK8ZG6DZL6
CompTox Dashboard (EPA)	DTXSID30163773
- InChI: InChI=1S/C15H10O5/c16-10-5-4-8(6-12(10)18)13-7-9-2-1-3-11(17)14(9)15(19)20-13/h1-7,16-18H Key: WHZXJVJVGGWZQI-UHFFFAOYSA-N
- SMILES: C1=CC2=C(C(=C1)O)C(=O)OC(=C2)C3=CC(=C(C=C3)O)O

Properties
Chemical formula	C_{15}H_{10}O_{5}
Molar mass	270.240 g·mol^{−1}
- Except where otherwise noted, data are given for materials in their standard state (at 25 °C [77 °F], 100 kPa). verify (what is ?) Infobox references

Thunberginol A is an isocoumarin found in Hydrangea macrophylla and the herbal preparation hydrangeae dulcis folium which is produced from its leaves.
