= Thunberginol C =

- Chemical structure of thunberginol C

Names
- IUPAC name 6,8-dihydroxy-3-(4-hydroxyphenyl)-3,4-dihydroisochromen-1-one

Identifiers
CAS Number	147517-06-4
3D model (JSmol)	Interactive image
ChemSpider	8508871
PubChem CID	10333412
UNII	X3P5X86ZBF
CompTox Dashboard (EPA)	DTXSID00438304
- InChI: InChI=1S/C15H12O5/c16-10-3-1-8(2-4-10)13-6-9-5-11(17)7-12(18)14(9)15(19)20-13/h1-5,7,13,16-18H,6H2 Key: WMAITHDYVBQITD-UHFFFAOYSA-N
- SMILES: C1C(OC(=O)C2=C(C=C(C=C21)O)O)C3=CC=C(C=C3)O

Properties
Chemical formula	C_{15}H_{12}O_{5}
Molar mass	272.25 g/mol
- Except where otherwise noted, data are given for materials in their standard state (at 25 °C [77 °F], 100 kPa). verify (what is ?) Infobox references

Thunberginol C is a dihydroisocoumarin found in Hydrangeae Dulcis Folium, the processed leaves of Hydrangea macrophylla var. thunbergii.
