= 3,4′-Dihydroxystilbene =

Names
- Preferred IUPAC name 3-[2-(4-Hydroxyphenyl)ethen-1-yl]phenol

Identifiers
CAS Number	63877-76-9; 62574-04-3 (non-specific)
3D model (JSmol)	(trans): Interactive image
ChemSpider	8346853 (trans)
PubChem CID	54350316; 10171348 (trans)
UNII	4DC9L42B37
CompTox Dashboard (EPA)	DTXSID00710753
- InChI: InChI=1S/C14H12O2/c15-13-8-6-11(7-9-13)4-5-12-2-1-3-14(16)10-12/h1-10,15-16H/b5-4+ Key: UFGKEFGYNRJIGO-SNAWJCMRSA-N; InChI=1S/C14H12O2/c15-13-8-6-11(7-9-13)4-5-12-2-1-3-14(16)10-12/h1-10,15-16H Key: UFGKEFGYNRJIGO-UHFFFAOYSA-N; (trans): InChI=1/C14H12O2/c15-13-8-6-11(7-9-13)4-5-12-2-1-3-14(16)10-12/h1-10,15-16H/b5-4+ Key: UFGKEFGYNRJIGO-SNAWJCMRBG
- SMILES: (trans): Oc2cc(/C=C/c1ccc(O)cc1)ccc2

Properties
Chemical formula	C_{14}H_{12}O_{2}
Molar mass	212.24 g/mol
- Except where otherwise noted, data are given for materials in their standard state (at 25 °C [77 °F], 100 kPa). Infobox references

3,4′-Dihydroxystilbene is a stilbenoid found in the roots of Hydrangea macrophylla.

== See also ==
- 4,4'-Dihydroxystilbene
- Resveratrol
