= Amacha =

Japanese herbal tea

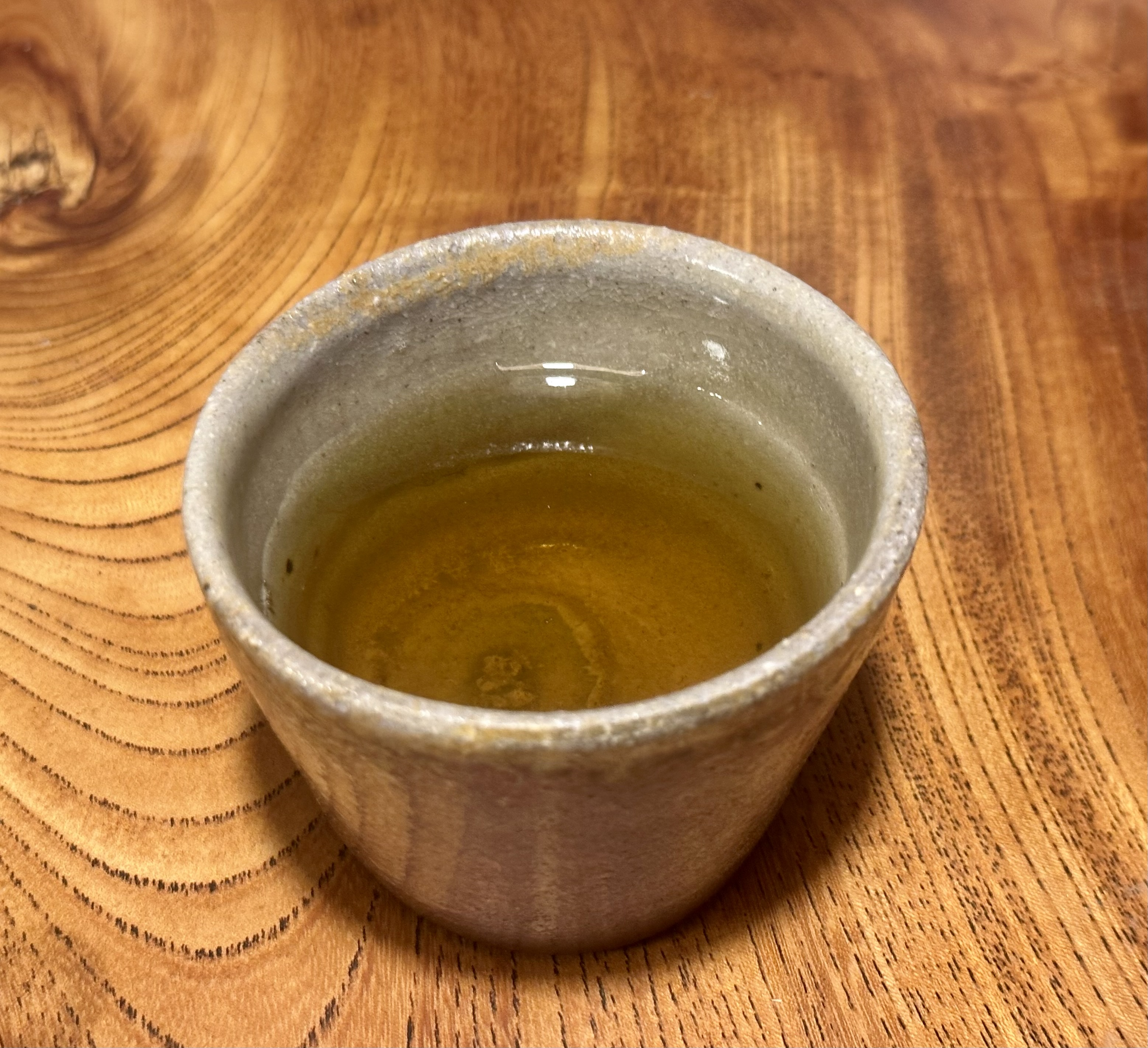
A cup of amacha

Amacha (甘茶; [amat͡ɕa]) is a Japanese herbal tea made from fermented leaves of Hydrangea macrophylla var. thunbergii. The name derives from the characters for sweet (甘い; [amai]) and tea (茶; [t͡ɕa]).

Amacha means sweet tea. This tea contains tannin and phyllodulcin, a sweetener 400–800 times sweeter than table sugar (sucrose) or 2 times sweeter than saccharin. It does not contain caffeine. The beverage is credited with antiallergic properties. It is also used in the prevention of periodontitis.

This tea is often used in ceremonies celebrating Buddha's Birthday, in Japanese Buddhism on April 8. At that occasion, Japanese people pour amacha on small Buddha statues decorated with flowers, as if bathing a newborn baby.

== See also ==
- Amazake (甘酒), a traditional sweet, low- or non-alcohol (depending on recipes) Japanese drink made from fermented rice
- Jiaogulan in Chinese or amachazuru in Japanese (甘茶蔓) or Gynostemma pentaphyllum in Latin, a medicinal plant
- Sweet tea, a style of iced tea commonly consumed in the United States
