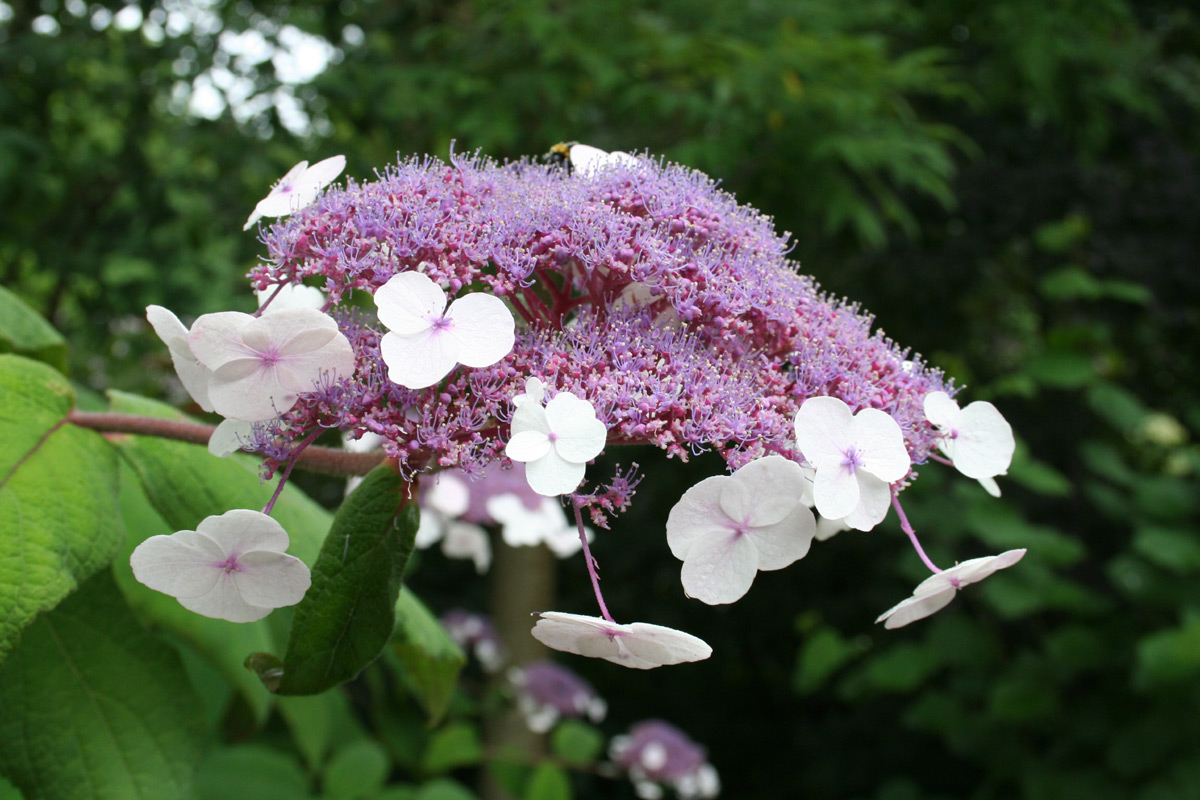

Scientific classification
- Kingdom: Plantae
- Clade: Tracheophytes
- Clade: Angiosperms
- Clade: Eudicots
- Clade: Asterids
- Order: Cornales
- Family: Hydrangeaceae
- Genus: Hydrangea
- Species: H. aspera

Binomial name
- Hydrangea aspera Buch.-Ham. ex D. Don; Prodr. fl. nepal. 211. 1825

Synonyms
- Hortensia aspera Ham. ex Dippel; Hydrangea alba Reinw. ex Miq.; Hydrangea coacta C.F.Wei; Hydrangea glabripes Rehder; Hydrangea kawakamii Hayata; Hydrangea oblongifolia Blume; Hydrangea pubescens Decne.; Hydrangea villosa Rehder

= Hydrangea aspera =

Species of flowering plant

Hydrangea aspera is a species of flowering plant in the family Hydrangeaceae native to dense forests in the region between the Himalayas, across southern China, to Taiwan. It is a large, erect deciduous shrub growing to 3 m (10 ft) tall and wide, with broadly oval leaves and dense branches. The flowers are typically borne in large flat heads in late summer, and are in variable shades of pale blue and pink, fringed by white or pale pink sterile florets.

The Latin aspera means "rough-textured" and refers to the downy lower surface of the leaves.

Due to how highly cultivated Hydrangea aspera is, coupled with the extensive species range, the related taxonomy of subspecies and potential synonyms is uncertain.

== Anatomy and characteristics ==
Hydrangea aspera has lace capped, flat-topped inflorescences with flowers that vary in color based on the pH level of the soil. The sterile flowers of this species have longer sepals than those of the fertile flowers. Plants that grow in more acidic soil have flowers that are various shades of blue. The lower the pH level is, the more vibrant or pigmented the blue color appears. At higher or more alkaline pH levels, the flowers are various shades of pink. In addition to the pH level of the soil, the amount of soluble aluminum available in the soil also affects the flower color. When a plant is able to absorb more aluminum ions, the flower color is found to be more blue.

The coarse texture of the leaves of Hydrangea aspera is one of the key characteristics that differentiates this species from the subspecies of Hydrangea aspera, as well as the other species under the genus Hydrangea. The shape, size, and lower leaf texture of this species varies slightly depending on the exact region where it is naturally found.

== Cultivation ==
The plant is widely cultivated, and favors a sheltered position in acidic or neutral soil, with best growth often in partial or afternoon shade. The leaves, in some forms exceeding 30.5 cm (12 inches) long, are vulnerable to drying winds as well as physical wind damage. Numerous cultivars have been produced as ornamental subjects for parks and gardens. They include:

- 'Anthony Bullivent'
- 'Longipes'
- 'Mauvette'
- 'Peter Chappell'
- 'The Ditch'

In addition to forms of garden origin, various forms of wild origin are cultivated such as Kawakamii, Macrophylla, Robusta, Sargentiana, Strigosa, and Villosa. The phenotype for plant images returned by a web search on such terms can vary widely, a sign of unsettled taxonomy or complex expression of forms due to wide geographic ranges or other factors. Some authorities give full species status, e. g. H. robusta and H. longipes, whereas other sources assign subspecies, e.g. H. aspera ssp. robusta, or H. aspera ssp. kawakamii. Most researchers and horticulturalists agree that further study is needed to solidify the taxonomy, as there is an insufficient amount of data published. This is especially relevant in respect to the viability of hybrids, whether or not hybrids are sterile, and the chromosomal differences between the aforementioned groups, as further data in these sectors could significantly assist with distinguishing the species and subspecies.

The cultivar H. aspera 'Macrophylla' (not to be confused with H. macrophylla) has gained the Royal Horticultural Society's Award of Garden Merit.
