= Thunberginol G =

- Chemical structure of thunberginol G

Names
- Preferred IUPAC name 3-(3,4-Dihydroxyphenyl)-8-hydroxy-3,4-dihydro-1H-2-benzopyran-1-one

Identifiers
CAS Number	80394-88-3
3D model (JSmol)	Interactive image
ChemSpider	8598786
PubChem CID	10423358
UNII	M9D65AW7XT
CompTox Dashboard (EPA)	DTXSID70439707
- InChI: InChI=1S/C15H12O5/c16-10-5-4-8(6-12(10)18)13-7-9-2-1-3-11(17)14(9)15(19)20-13/h1-6,13,16-18H,7H2 Key: RQDGXYMBVTZQNF-UHFFFAOYSA-N
- SMILES: C1C(OC(=O)C2=C1C=CC=C2O)C3=CC(=C(C=C3)O)O

Properties
Chemical formula	C_{15}H_{12}O_{5}
Molar mass	272.25 g/mol
- Except where otherwise noted, data are given for materials in their standard state (at 25 °C [77 °F], 100 kPa). verify (what is ?) Infobox references

Thunberginol G is a dihydroisocoumarin found in Hydrangeae Dulcis Folium, the processed leaves of Hydrangea macrophylla var. thunbergii.
