= Garbanzol =

Names
- IUPAC name (2R,3R)-3,4′,7-Trihydroxyflavan-4-one
- Systematic IUPAC name (2R,3R)-3,7-Dihydroxy-2-(4-hydroxyphenyl)-2,3-dihydro-4H-benzopyran-4-one

Identifiers
CAS Number	1226-22-8
3D model (JSmol)	Interactive image
ChEBI	CHEBI:27587
ChEMBL	ChEMBL254051
ChemSpider	390851
KEGG	C09751
PubChem CID	442410
UNII	T87V438N7C
CompTox Dashboard (EPA)	DTXSID40331820
- InChI: InChI=1S/C15H12O5/c16-9-3-1-8(2-4-9)15-14(19)13(18)11-6-5-10(17)7-12(11)20-15/h1-7,14-17,19H/t14-,15+/m0/s1 Key: VRTGGIJPIYOHGT-LSDHHAIUSA-N; InChI=1/C15H12O5/c16-9-3-1-8(2-4-9)15-14(19)13(18)11-6-5-10(17)7-12(11)20-15/h1-7,14-17,19H/t14-,15+/m0/s1 Key: VRTGGIJPIYOHGT-LSDHHAIUBR
- SMILES: O=C2c3c(O[C@H](c1ccc(O)cc1)[C@H]2O)cc(O)cc3

Properties
Chemical formula	C_{15}H_{12}O_{5}
Molar mass	272.25 g/mol
- Except where otherwise noted, data are given for materials in their standard state (at 25 °C [77 °F], 100 kPa). verify (what is ?) Infobox references

Garbanzol is a flavanonol, a type of flavonoid. It can be found in the seed of Cicer arietinum (Bengal gram), in the shoot of Phaseolus lunatus (butter bean) and in the root of Pterocarpus marsupium (Bastard teak).
