= Lunularic acid =

Names
- Preferred IUPAC name 2-Hydroxy-6-[2-(4-hydroxyphenyl)ethyl]benzoic acid

Identifiers
CAS Number	23255-59-6
3D model (JSmol)	Interactive image
ChemSpider	141785
KEGG	C10268
PubChem CID	161413
UNII	9ZQ3FYV21C
CompTox Dashboard (EPA)	DTXSID40177826
- InChI: InChI=1S/C15H14O4/c16-12-8-5-10(6-9-12)4-7-11-2-1-3-13(17)14(11)15(18)19/h1-3,5-6,8-9,16-17H,4,7H2,(H,18,19) Key: GFSQDOUEUWXRSL-UHFFFAOYSA-N; InChI=1S/C15H14O4/c16-12-8-5-10(6-9-12)4-7-11-2-1-3-13(17)14(11)15(18)19/h1-3,5-6,8-9,16-17H,4,7H2,(H,18,19) Key: GFSQDOUEUWXRSL-UHFFFAOYSA-N; InChI=1/C15H14O4/c16-12-8-5-10(6-9-12)4-7-11-2-1-3-13(17)14(11)15(18)19/h1-3,5-6,8-9,16-17H,4,7H2,(H,18,19) Key: GFSQDOUEUWXRSL-UHFFFAOYAI
- SMILES: C1=CC(=C(C(=C1)O)C(=O)O)CCC2=CC=C(C=C2)O

Properties
Chemical formula	C_{15}H_{14}O_{4}
Molar mass	258.27 g/mol
- Except where otherwise noted, data are given for materials in their standard state (at 25 °C [77 °F], 100 kPa). Infobox references

Lunularic acid is a dihydrostilbenoid found in the liverwort Lunularia cruciata and in the roots of Hydrangea macrophylla.

A lunularic acid decarboxylase has been detected from the liverwort Conocephalum conicum.
