= Hydrangenol =

- Chemical structure of hydrangenol

Names
- Preferred IUPAC name 8-Hydroxy-3-(4-hydroxyphenyl)-1H-2-benzopyran-1-one

Identifiers
CAS Number	480-47-7
3D model (JSmol)	Interactive image
ChEBI	CHEBI:5776
ChemSpider	106486
KEGG	C10262
PubChem CID	119199
UNII	TL8PI7PHV1
CompTox Dashboard (EPA)	DTXSID20963981
- InChI: InChI=1S/C15H12O4/c16-11-6-4-9(5-7-11)13-8-10-2-1-3-12(17)14(10)15(18)19-13/h1-7,13,16-17H,8H2 Key: DGKDFNDHPXVXHW-UHFFFAOYSA-N; InChI=1/C15H12O4/c16-11-6-4-9(5-7-11)13-8-10-2-1-3-12(17)14(10)15(18)19-13/h1-7,13,16-17H,8H2 Key: DGKDFNDHPXVXHW-UHFFFAOYAS
- SMILES: C1C(OC(=O)C2=C1C=CC=C2O)C3=CC=C(C=C3)O

Properties
Chemical formula	C_{15}H_{12}O_{4}
Molar mass	256.25 g/mol
- Except where otherwise noted, data are given for materials in their standard state (at 25 °C [77 °F], 100 kPa). verify (what is ?) Infobox references

Hydrangenol is a dihydroisocoumarin. It can be found in Hydrangea macrophylla, as well as its 8-O-glucoside. (−)-Hydrangenol 4′-O-glucoside and (+)-hydrangenol 4′-O-glucoside can be found in Hydrangeae Dulcis Folium, the processed leaves of H. macrophylla var. thunbergii. It has been shown to suppress production of several inflammatory signalling molecules including MMP-1, MMP-3, COX-2 and IL-6.
