= Pinobanksin =

Names
- IUPAC name (2R,3R)-3,5,7-Trihydroxyflavan-4-one
- Systematic IUPAC name (2R,3R)-3,5,7-Trihydroxy-2-phenyl-2,3-dihydro-4H-1-benzopyran-4-one
- Other names 3,5,7-trihydroxy-2-phenyl-2,3-dihydro-4H-chromen-4-one

Identifiers
CAS Number	548-82-3
3D model (JSmol)	Interactive image
ChEBI	CHEBI:28103
ChEMBL	ChEMBL608410
ChemSpider	65962
KEGG	C09826
PubChem CID	73202
UNII	BK3ABR33DT
CompTox Dashboard (EPA)	DTXSID10203287
- InChI: InChI=1S/C15H12O5/c16-9-6-10(17)12-11(7-9)20-15(14(19)13(12)18)8-4-2-1-3-5-8/h1-7,14-17,19H/t14-,15+/m0/s1 Key: SUYJZKRQHBQNCA-LSDHHAIUSA-N; InChI=1/C15H12O5/c16-9-6-10(17)12-11(7-9)20-15(14(19)13(12)18)8-4-2-1-3-5-8/h1-7,14-17,19H/t14-,15+/m0/s1 Key: SUYJZKRQHBQNCA-LSDHHAIUBG
- SMILES: O=C2c3c(O[C@H](c1ccccc1)[C@H]2O)cc(O)cc3O

Properties
Chemical formula	C_{15}H_{12}O_{5}
Molar mass	272.25 g/mol
Density	1.497 g/mL
- Except where otherwise noted, data are given for materials in their standard state (at 25 °C [77 °F], 100 kPa). verify (what is ?) Infobox references

Pinobanksin is an antioxidant bioflavonoid (specifically a flavanonol, a category of flavonol) that inhibits peroxidation of low density lipoprotein and it has electron donor properties reducing alpha-tocopherol radicals. It is present in sunflower honey.

Pinobanksin is biosynthesized from pinocembrin.
