= Pinocembrin =

Names
- IUPAC name 5,7-Dihydroxy-2-phenyl-2,3-dihydro-4H-chromen-4-one
- Other names Dihydrochrysin; Galangin flavanone 5,7-Dihydroxyflavanone; 5,7-Dihydroxy-2-phenyl-2,3-dihydro-4H-chromen-4-one; 4H-1-Benzopyran-4-one, 2,3-dihydro-5,7-dihydroxy-2-phenyl- 5,7-Dihydroxy-2-phenyl-chroman-4-one

Identifiers
CAS Number	68745-38-0 (±); 480-39-7 (S)-(+); 206660-42-6 (R)-(-)
3D model (JSmol)	Interactive image
ChEBI	CHEBI:28157
ChEMBL	ChEMBL399910
ChemSpider	208593
KEGG	C09827
PubChem CID	238782
UNII	8T7C8CH791
CompTox Dashboard (EPA)	DTXSID80285959 DTXSID3075412, DTXSID80285959
- InChI: InChI=1S/C15H12O4/c16-10-6-11(17)15-12(18)8-13(19-14(15)7-10)9-4-2-1-3-5-9/h1-7,13,16-17H,8H2 Key: URFCJEUYXNAHFI-UHFFFAOYSA-N; InChI=1/C15H12O4/c16-10-6-11(17)15-12(18)8-13(19-14(15)7-10)9-4-2-1-3-5-9/h1-7,13,16-17H,8H2 Key: URFCJEUYXNAHFI-UHFFFAOYAA
- SMILES: O=C2c3c(OC(c1ccccc1)C2)cc(O)cc3O

Properties
Chemical formula	C_{15}H_{12}O_{4}
Molar mass	256.257 g·mol^{−1}
Density	1.386 g/mL
- Except where otherwise noted, data are given for materials in their standard state (at 25 °C [77 °F], 100 kPa). verify (what is ?) Infobox references

Pinocembrin is a flavanone, a type of flavonoid. It is an antioxidant found in damiana, honey, fingerroot, and propolis.

Pinocembrin can be converted biosynthetically to pinobanksin by hydroxylation.

== See also ==
- Pinobanksin
