= Dihydroisocoumarin =

Chemical structure of hydrangenol, a simple dihydroisocoumarin

Dihydroisocoumarins are phenolic compounds related to isocoumarin. Dihydroisocoumarin glucosides can be found in Caryocar glabrum.
