= Budha Deula =

- Location in Odisha

Religion
- Affiliation: Hinduism
- Deity: Lord Shiva

Location
- Location: Bhubaneswar
- State: Odisha
- Country: India
- Interactive map of Budha Deula
- Coordinates: 20°14′24.93″N 85°50′1.91″E

Architecture
- Type: Kalingan Style (Kalinga Architecture)
- Completed: 10-11th century A.D.
- Elevation: 20 m (66 ft)

The Budha Deula temple is an Indian is devoted to Lord Shiva. It is located in Badu Sahi, Old Town of Bhubaneswar in Odisha, India. The enshrined deities of this temple are two Siva lingas with circular yonipitha. Another four Siva lingas with yonipitha are also found in between the larger two. These sculptures are discovered from Bindusagar and are placed here.

== Cultural significance ==
The temple is surrounded by Bindusagar tank in north, Mohini temple in south and Akhada Chandi temple in west. It attains its huge importance during sradha, pinda, mundanakriya

== Architectural features ==
The main door of the temple faces towards east. This shrine is a RCC roofed hall of modern construction, the doorjambs are plain.

== See also ==
- List of Hindu temples in India
