= Anniversary book =

Historic manuscripts commemorating the dead

Anniversary books (Latin libri anniversariorum; also known as obituario) are calendars with the names and endowments of pious donors entered on the date of their death or burial in order to hold an annual mass with intercessory prayers for the redemption of their souls. Most religious institutions throughout Western Christianity started keeping such registers during the High and Late Middle Ages, listing the anniversary masses, chantry services or obiits they were committed to celebrate on each day of the year.

In current usage Anglican churches keep a "chantry book" where the names of the faithful departed are recorded so as to commemorate every year their "years'mind".

Since the donors were hoping for eternal redemption, these books were contemporarily referred to as the heavenly Book of Life (latin liber vitae or liber vivorum, Book of the Living) mentioned in the Bible. Other terms comprise obituary or necrology, although the two are sometimes used to distinguish between actual anniversary books and their monastic predecessors which did not list endowments. The same terms are also used in French and Italian, whereas the German expressions are Jahrzeitbuch or Jahrtagsbuch.

While leading figures of the Reformation such as Martin Luther, Huldrych Zwingli and John Calvin rejected the idea of purgatory and therefore abolished the practices of intercession and anniversary masses, they were continued by Catholics for decades. Thousands of medieval and early modern manuscripts have survived in France and the Holy Roman Empire. Jean-Loup Lemaître has collected more than 3000 obituaries or anniversary books from France, whereas Rainer Hugener could trace over 1000 manuscripts from Swiss archives.
