= Siyue =

Fourth month of the Chinese calendar

Sìyuè

Chinese name
- Chinese: 四月
- Hanyu Pinyin: Sìyuè
Transcriptions
Standard Mandarin
- Hanyu Pinyin: Sìyuè

Korean name
- Hangul: 사월
- Hanja: 四月
Transcriptions
- Revised Romanization: Sawol

Traditional Korean name
- Hangul: 뱀달
- Hanja: 巳月
Transcriptions
- Revised Romanization: Baemdal

Japanese name
- Kanji: 四月
- Kana: しがつ
Transcriptions
- Romanization: Shigatsu

Traditional Japanese name
- Kanji: 卯月
- Kana: うづき
Transcriptions
- Romanization: Uzuki

Sìyuè (Chinese: 四月) is the fourth month of the Chinese calendar and calendars based on it, such as the Japanese calendar, Korean calendar and Vietnamese calendar. It follows Sānyuè and precedes Wǔyuè. It is known in Japanese as Shigatsu (Japanese: 四月) or traditionally Uzuki (Japanese: 卯月), and in Korean as Sawol (Korean: 사월; Hanja: 四月) or traditionally Baemdal (Korean: 뱀달; Hanja: 巳月). All of these words can also refer to the month of April in the Gregorian calendar.

== Names ==
In Mandarin Chinese, traditional names of the month include méiyuè (Chinese: 梅月), qīnghé (Chinese: 清和), mèngxià (Chinese: 孟夏) and yúyuè (Chinese: 餘月／余月).

In Japanese, the month is known as shigatsu (Japanese: 四月) or traditionally uzuki (Japanese: 卯月). One explanation derives uzuki from unohanazuki (卯の花月), which means "month of the deutzia flower". Another connects it with utsuki (植月), referring to the planting of rice. An alternative name for the month is mōka (孟夏).

== Observances ==
- Buddha's Birthday is celebrated on the 8th day of the 4th month in many Asian countries.
- Abushibarē (畔払い), a rite intended to protect crops from insect pests, is held around the middle of the 4th month in Okinawa.

== Dates ==
Below is a list of the start and end dates of Sìyuè in the Gregorian calendar. Because the 1-hour difference between China and Japan/Korea occasionally affects the date on which a new moon occurs, the dates below can differ from those of the Japanese and Korean calendars.

Dates of Sìyuè
Year	First day	Last day
2016	7 May	4 June
2017	26 April	25 May
2018	15 May	13 June
2019	5 May	2 June
2020	23 April	22 May
2020 (leap)	23 May	20 June
2021	12 May	9 June
2022	1 May	29 May
2023	19 May	17 June
2024	8 May	5 June
2025	28 April	26 May
2026	17 May	14 June
2027	6 May	4 June
2028	25 April	23 May
2029	13 May	11 June
2030	2 May	31 May
2031	21 May	19 June
2032	9 May	7 June
2033	29 April	27 May
2034	18 May	15 June
2035	8 May	5 June
2036	26 April	25 May
