= Hùng Kings' Festival =

Vietnamese festival

Hùng Vương Commemoration Day
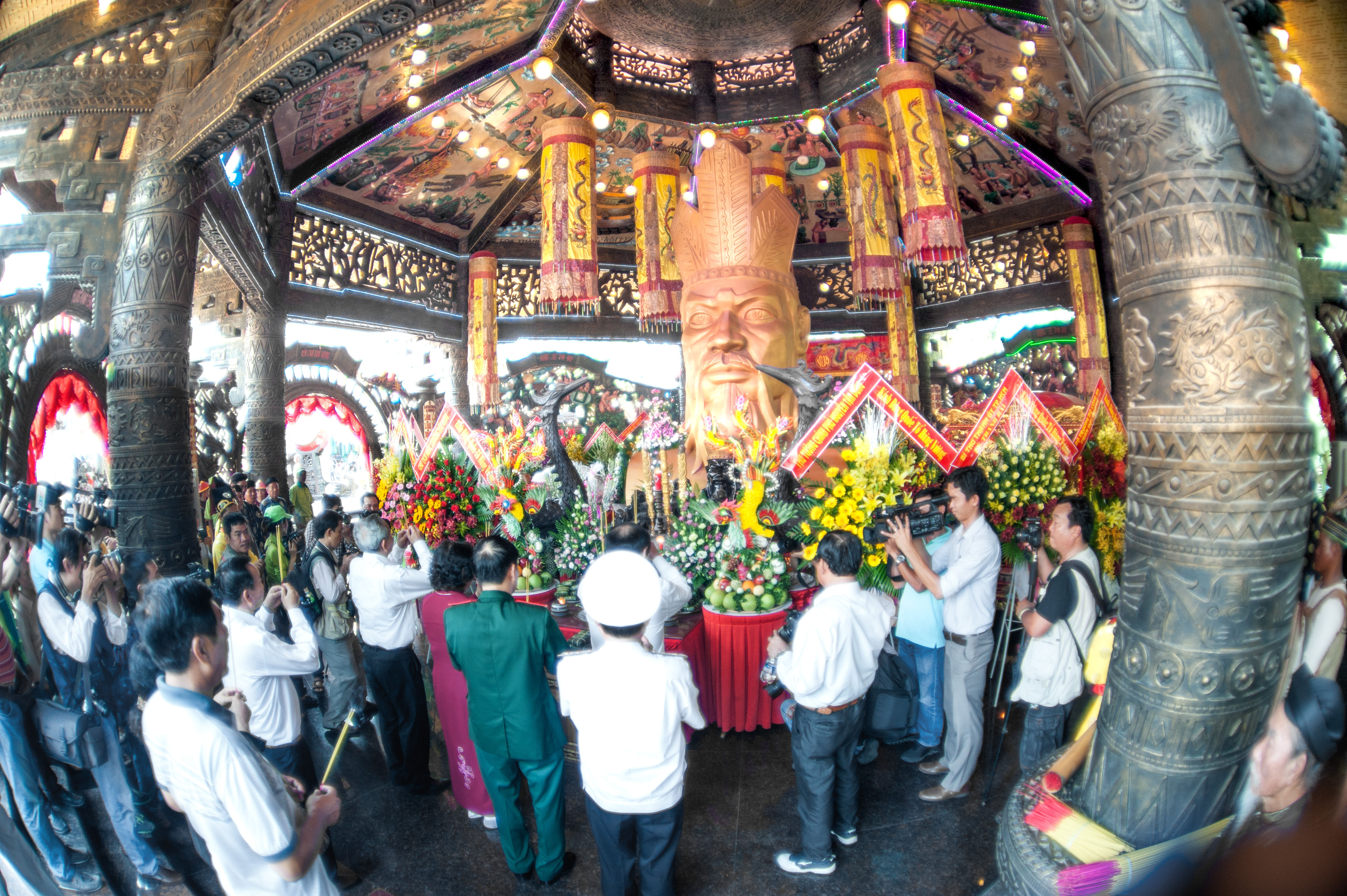
- Temple of Hùng Vương - Suối Tiên on Giỗ Tổ Hùng Vương
- Official name: Giỗ Tổ Hùng Vương
- Observed by: Vietnamese
- Type: Cultural
- Significance: Anniversary of Hùng Vương
- Observances: worship of Hùng Vương
- Date: 10th day of 3rd lunar month
- 2025 date: 7 April
- Frequency: annual

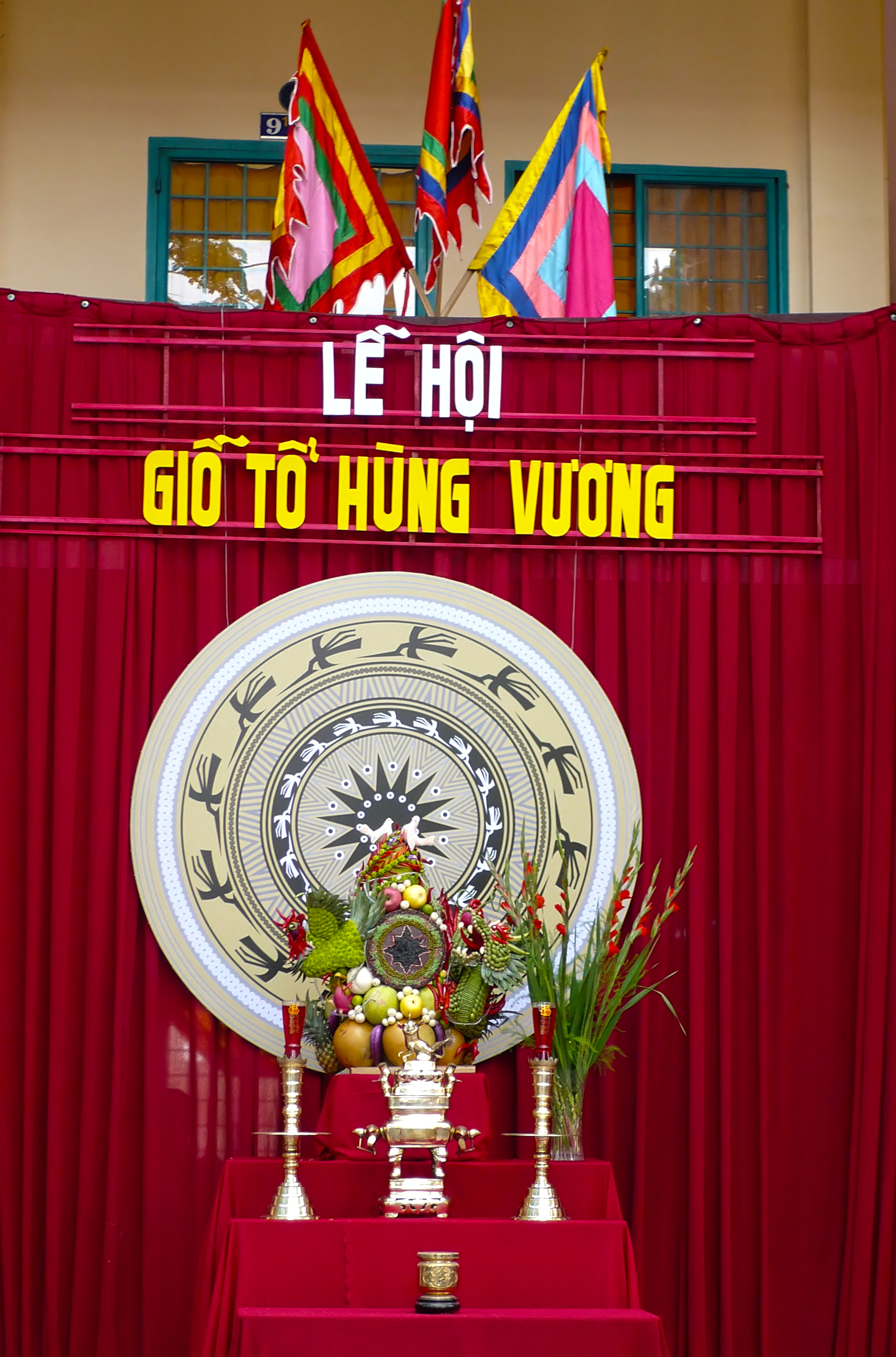
Hùng Vương altar on Giỗ Tổ Hùng Vương at a school

The Hùng Kings' Temple Festival (Vietnamese: Giỗ Tổ Hùng Vương or Lễ hội đền Hùng) is a Vietnamese festival held annually from the 1st to the 10th day of the third lunar month in honor of the Hùng King (Hùng Vương in Vietnamese). The main festival day, which is a public holiday in Vietnam since 2007, is on the 10th day.

Although the official name is the Death Anniversary of the Hùng Kings (Vietnamese: Giỗ Tổ Hùng Vương), the festival does not mark any specific date of death for any Hùng King.

== Festival ==
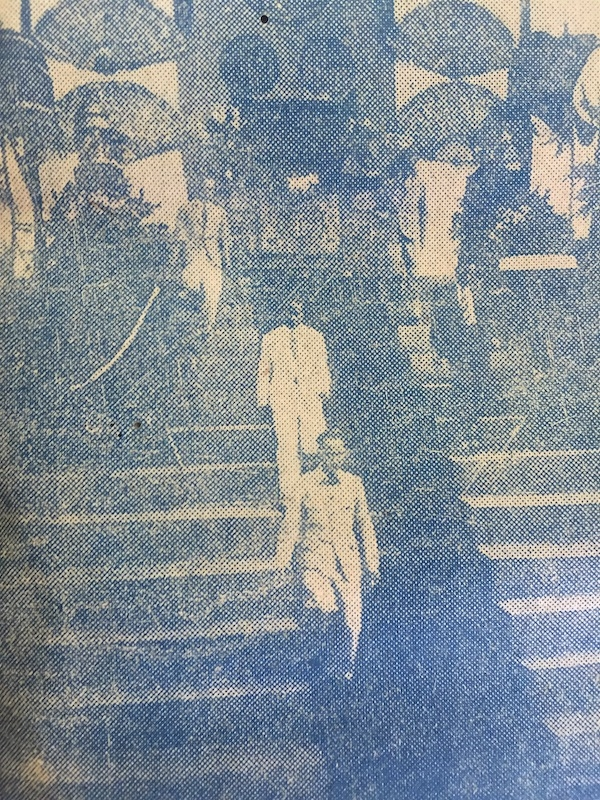
Ho Chi Minh participated in the Giỗ Tổ Hùng Vương ceremony in Hanoi in 1946

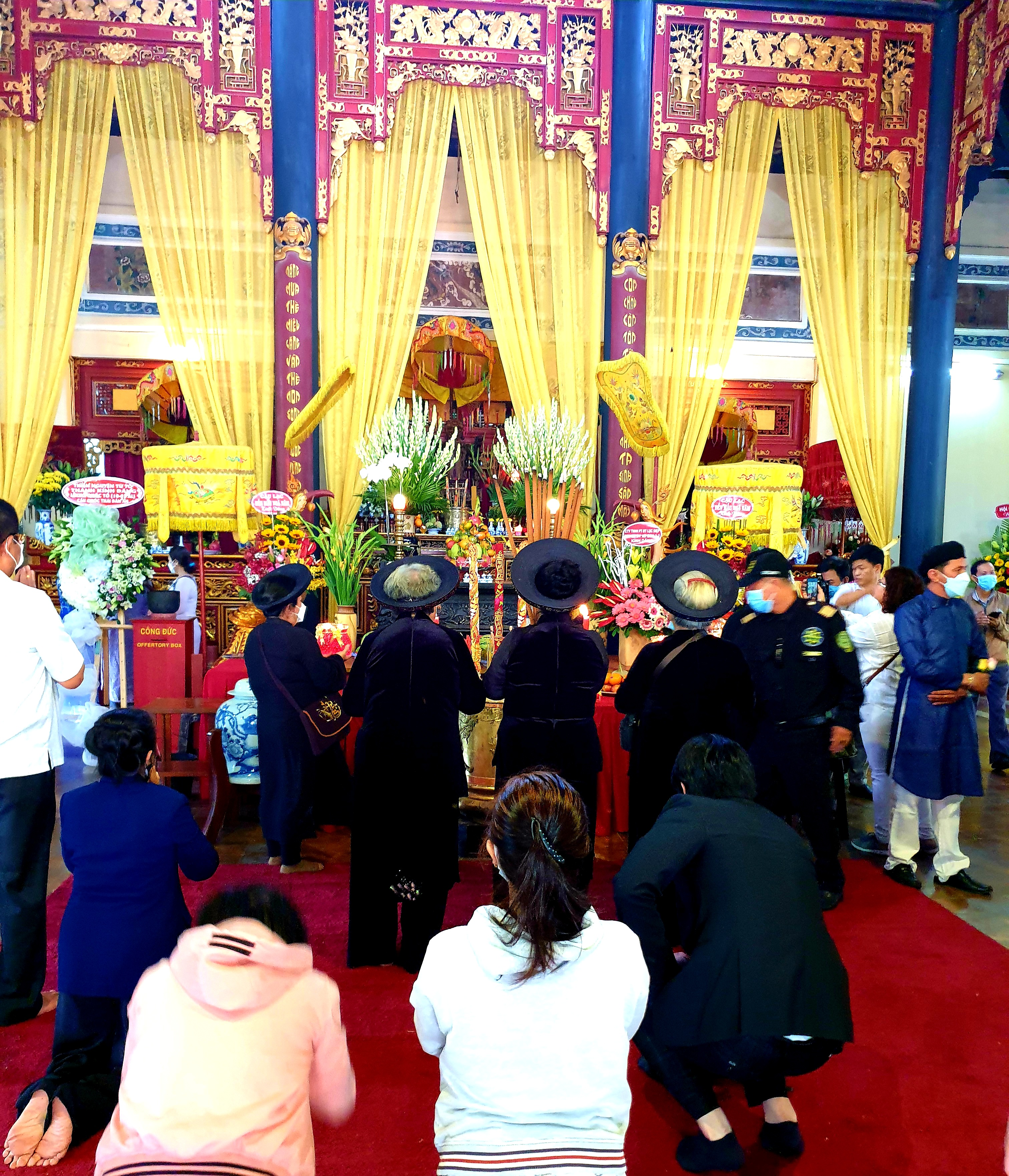
People are worshiping Hùng Kings at Temple of Hùng King, HCMC

The purpose of this ceremony is to remember and pay tribute to the Hung king who are the traditional founders and first kings of the nation. The festival began as a local holiday, but has become recognized as a national holiday starting in 2007. In 2016, the total number of visitors to the festival numbered seven million.

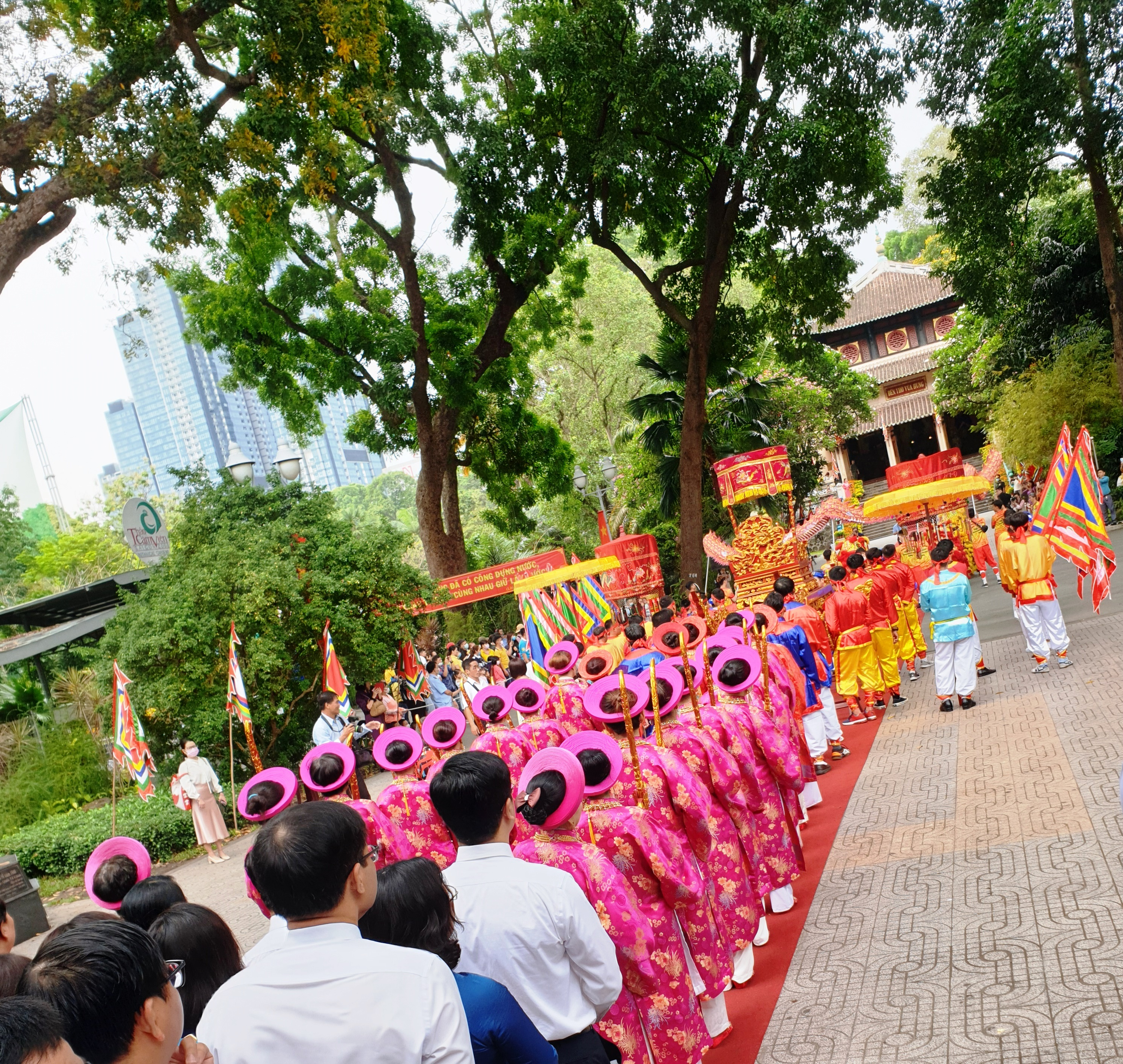
Ceremonial procession of Hùng Kings

== The major ceremony ==
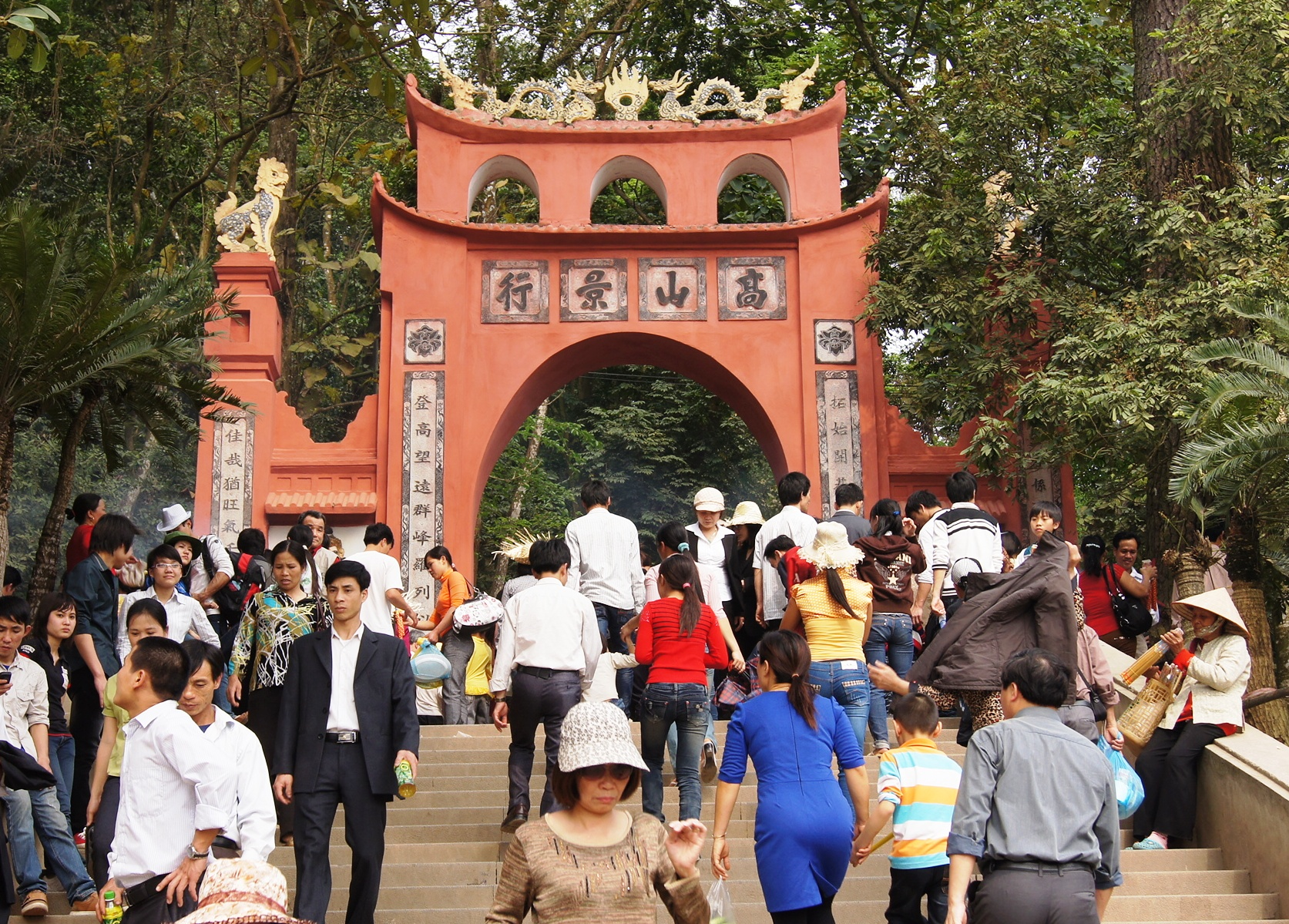
People make pilgrimage to Hùng Temple on Giỗ Tổ Hùng Vương

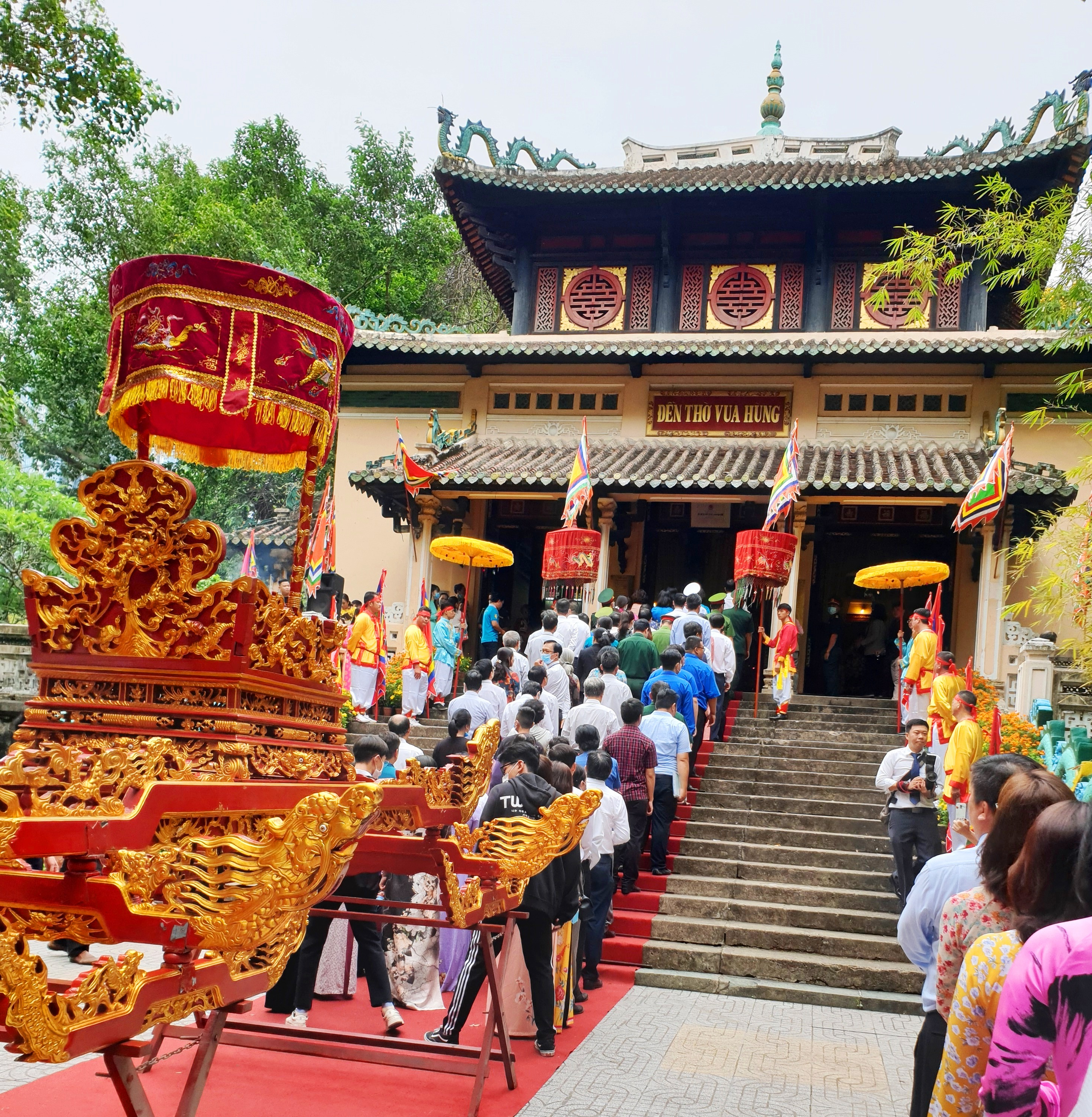
People come to worship at Temple of Hùng King

The ceremony takes place over several days, but the 10th day of the month is considered the most important. A procession starts at the foot of the mountain, and stops at every small temple before reaching the High Temple. Here, pilgrims offer prayers and incense to their ancestors.

== See also ==
- Giỗ
- Ancestor worship in Vietnam
