= Shaka at Birth (Tōdai-ji) =

Japanese Buddha Statue

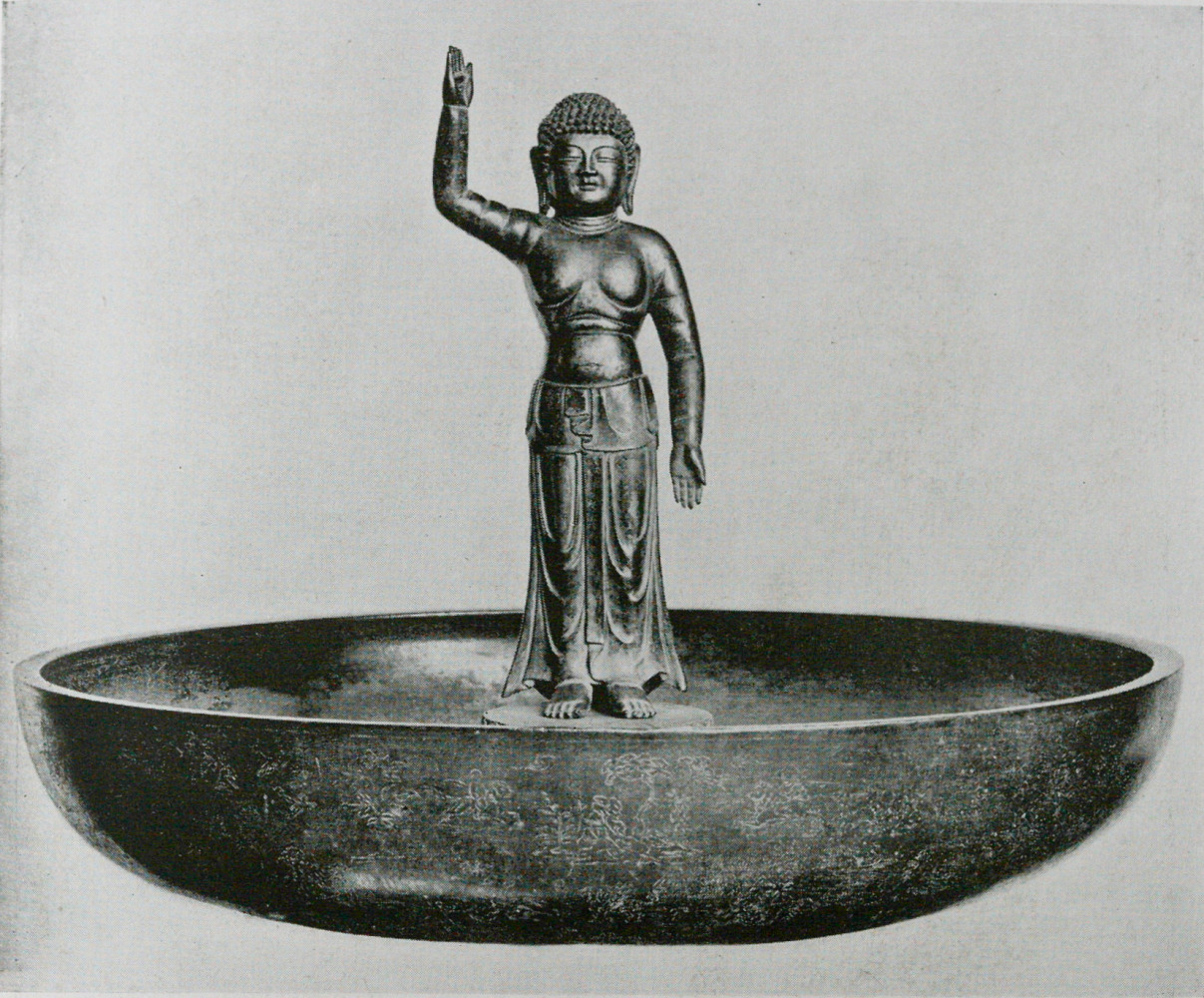
Shaka at Birth and lustration basin; gilt bronze; Nara period; height of figure 47.5 centimetres (1 ft 6.7 in); diameter of basin 89.2 centimetres (2 ft 11.1 in); National Treasures

The standing bronze statue of Shaka at Birth (銅造誕生釈迦仏立像, dōzō tanjō Shaka butsu ryūzō) at Tōdai-ji in the city of Nara in Japan, along with the lustration basin in which the image stands, are of the type used in the annual celebrations of the Buddha's birth on 8 April. The statue and its basin date to the Nara period (710–794) and have been designated National Treasures.

== Subject ==
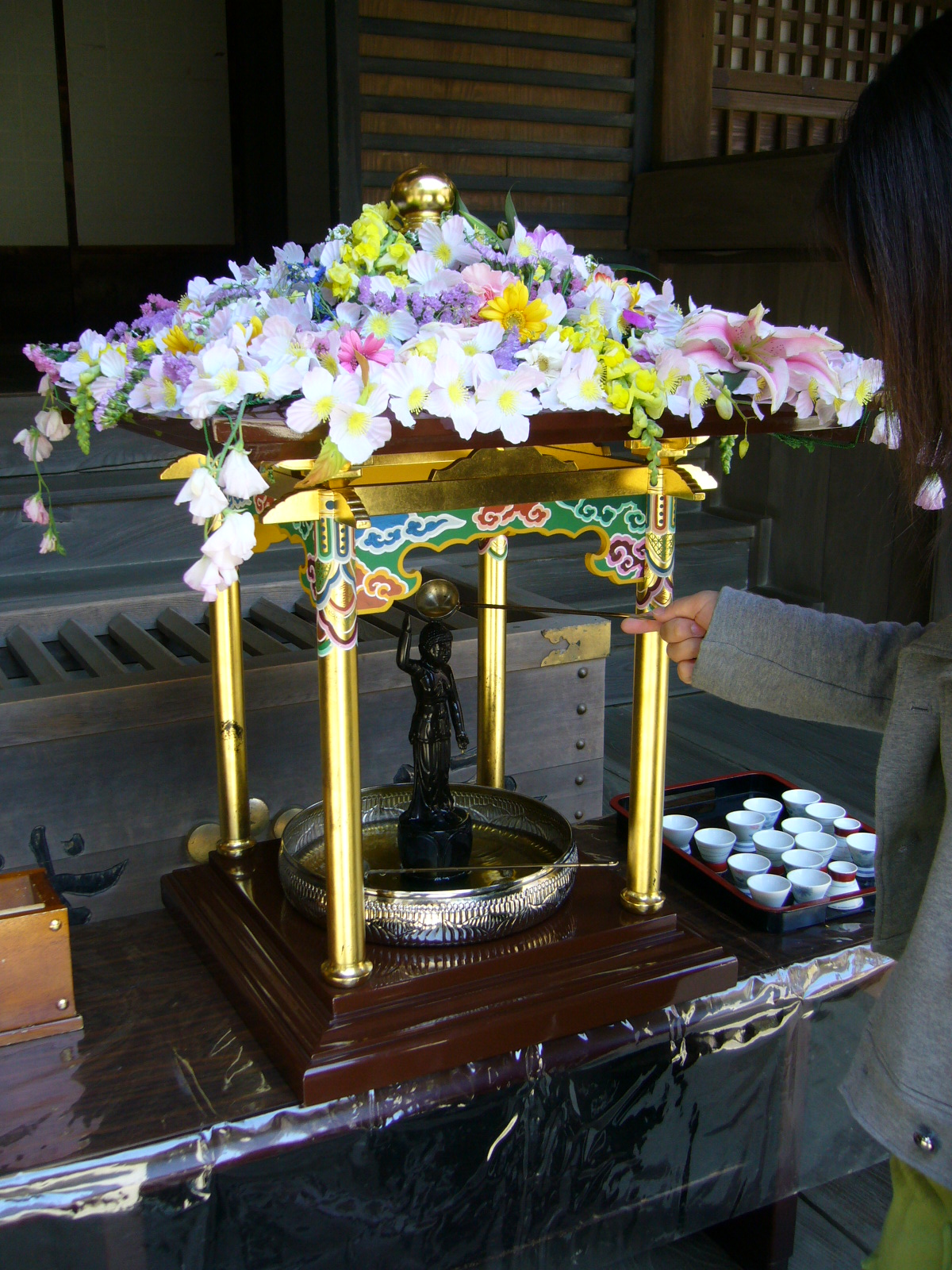
A local celebration of Buddha's birthday at Katori. Devotees ladle water over the image

The birth of Shakyamuni, the historical Buddha (Sanskrit: Siddhārtha Gautama or Śākyamuni), is one of the eight major events in the life of the Buddha that formed a popular subject for artistic representation. While Māyā was walking in the Lumbinī gardens and had stopped to pick flowers, the Buddha is said to have emerged from her right side. According to the Dīrghāgama Sūtra, the young prince immediately took seven steps in the four directions and declared "in the Heavens and on Earth, only I am the Venerable One". (Note: 天上天下唯我独尊 (tenjō tenga yuiga dokuson); as a modern idiom these words are sometimes used to satirize self-aggrandizing conceit) The Lalitavistara relates that the infant was then bathed by two nāga, Nanda and Upananda, serpent deities or Dragon Kings.

The Sutra on the meritorious action of bathing the Buddha's image was translated into Chinese in 710. Reenacting the legend of the Buddha's birth, the annual rite known as kanbutsu-e ("rite of sprinkling the Buddha", more popularly hana matsuri or "flower festival") sees the bathing of small Buddha statues amidst garlands of flowers. Perfumed water was once used but, since the nineteenth century, this has generally been replaced by sweet hydrangea tea known as amacha, or just water. (Note: Amacha was also used to sweeten beverages, before the introduction of sugar to Japan in the seventeenth century; mixed with ink it is used to write on paper that is the glued to the wall of houses to ward off insects) Another variant sees the image repeatedly wiped with a silk cloth rather than anointed.

Celebrations of the Buddha's birth have been staged in Japan on the eighth day of the fourth month since Empress Suiko ordered that vegetarian feasts should be held in all the temples in 606. Kanbutsu-e or "sprinkling" ceremonies are known to have been held at the Seiryōden, led by a priest from Gangō-ji, in 840 and the Engi shiki lists the utensils used at these Palace ceremonies. Earlier temple records and inventories of their treasures list kanbutsuzō or "images for sprinkling" at Hōryū-ji and Daian-ji, and early surviving examples include one dating to the Asuka period at Shōgen-ji (正眼寺) in Aichi Prefecture (Important Cultural Property). This example at Tōdai-ji is generally dated to the 750s.

At Tōdai-ji today, a temporary flower hall (花御堂, hanamidō) is erected each year before the Daibutsuden (Great Buddha Hall). This National Treasure Shaka at Birth was still used in the ceremony when Langdon Warner was writing in the late 1950s and indeed as late as the 1980s. More recently it has been replaced with a copy.

== Statue ==
Evoking the legend of his birth, the statue of the infant Buddha has its right arm raised, pointing to heaven, and left arm pendant, pointing to the earth; he is bare chested and wears a skirt. The elongated earlobes and spiral-shaped curls of hair, resembling snail-shells, are among the eighty secondary physical characteristics of the Buddha. The deep ridges on both body and arms "emphasize the fleshiness" of the smiling child's body. The soft, rounded, "sweet-faced" features of the young Buddha have been likened to those of the celestial musicians on the roughly contemporary octagonal lantern erected in front of the Tōdai-ji Daibutsuden. The original pedestal on which the image stands has been lost and replaced with a small wooden base carved with lotus petals.

== Basin ==
Like the statue, the basin or kanbutsuban is the largest of its type known. The exterior has incised images of human figures, animals real and imaginary, birds, and butterflies, set against a landscape of flowers, grasses, shrubs, trees, mountain peaks, clouds, and pagodas. Images of hermits with banners riding on birds, barbarians in foreign garb astride Chinese lions, and hunters chasing tigers are similar to motifs found on metalwork in Tōdai-ji's celebrated repository the Shōsōin. Much of this decoration is secular rather than Buddhist in inspiration. Like the statue, the basin shows the influence of contemporary Tang China.

== Technology ==
Both statue and basin are of gilt bronze, cast using the lost-wax method. The statue was cast in one piece, other than for the right forearm which is a restoration; the join is clearly visible. Pieces of the clay core were left inside after casting. The decorative motifs on the outside of the basin were engraved and the background of dots hammered with a burin in the technique known as "fish-roe" (魚々子, nanako). Both statue and bowl are recognized as masterpieces of eighth-century metalwork.

== See also ==
- List of National Treasures of Japan (sculptures)
- Hanamatsuri
- Vesak
