= Buddha's Birthday =

Birthday of Siddhartha Gautama

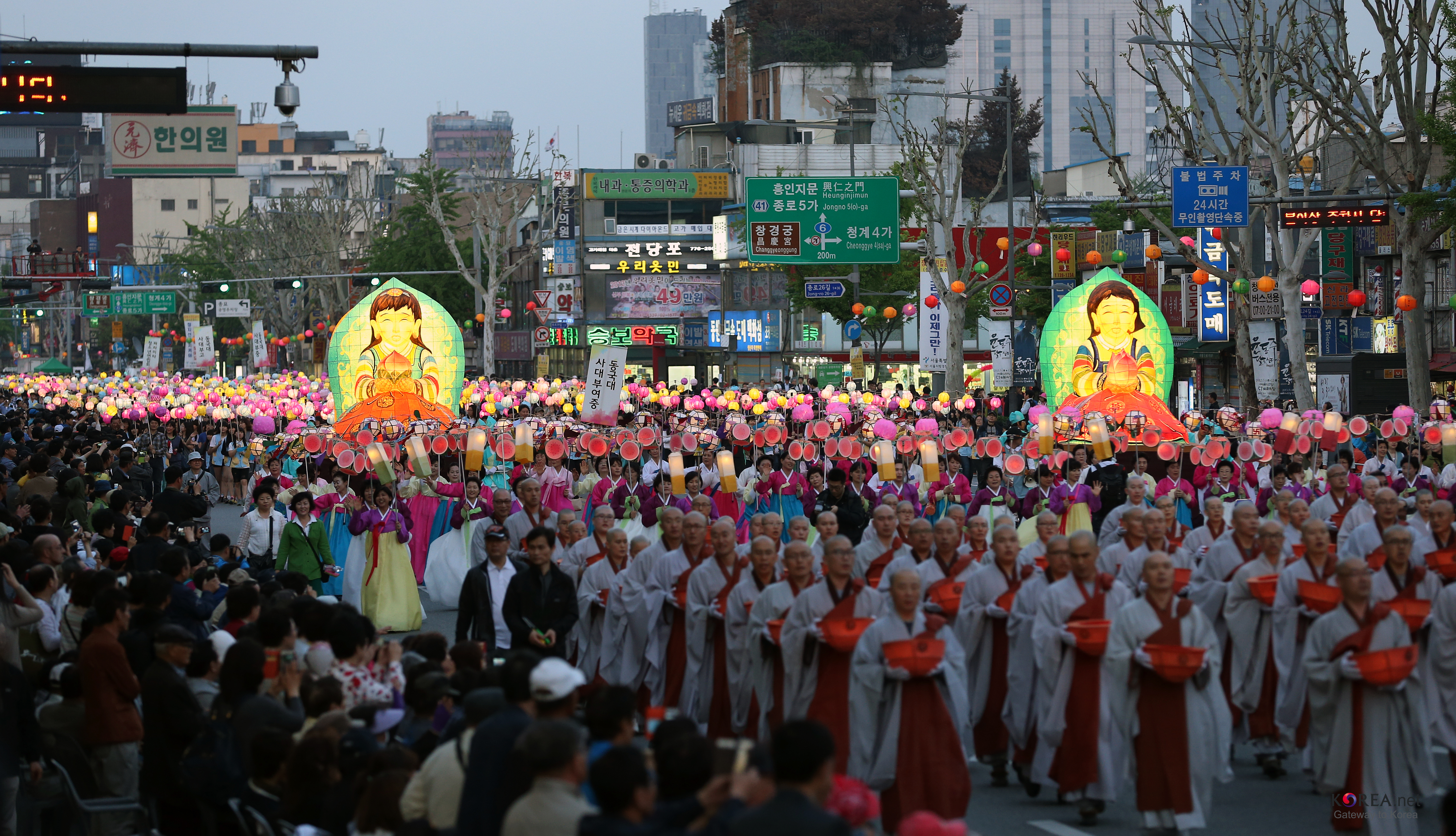
- Buddha's Birthday celebration in Seoul, South Korea
- Also called: Buddha Jayanti; Vesākha बुद्ध पूर्णिमा बुद्ध पौर्णिमा ဗုဒ္ဓမွေးနေ့ বুদ্ধ পূর্ণিমা ବୁଦ୍ଧ ପୂର୍ଣ୍ଣିମା Fódàn (佛誕); Phật Đản 초파일 (Chopa-il) វិសាខបូជា (Visak Buchea) 부처님 오신 날 (Bucheonim osin nal)
- Observed by: Buddhists in East Asia and Newar Buddhists and some Hindus in South and Southeast Asia (as Vesak)
- Type: Buddhist, cultural
- Significance: Commemoration of the birth of Gautama Buddha
- Date: varies by region: April 8 (Japan); Second Sunday in May (Taiwan); 8th day of the 4th lunar month (mainland China, Hong Kong, Vietnam, the Philippines and East Asia); first full moon of Vaisakha (South Asia and Southeast Asia)
- 2025 date: 5 May (China, Vietnam, the Philippines and East Asia): 22 May (Cambodia, Singapore, Myanmar, Thailand); 23 May (Indonesia)
- 2026 date: 24 May (China, Hong Kong, South Korea, Vietnam, the Philippines and East Asia) 11 May (Cambodia, Thailand); 12 May (Nepal, Malaysia, Myanmar, Singapore, Bangladesh) 13 May (Indonesia, Sri Lanka)
- 2027 date: 30 April (Myanmar); 1 May (India, Sri Lanka); 13 May (China, Vietnam, the Philippines and East Asia); 31 May (Cambodia, Thailand, Singapore, Malaysia, Indonesia)
- Frequency: annual
- Related to: Vesak

Buddha's Birthday or Buddha Day (also known as Buddha Jayanti, Buddha Purnima, and Buddha Pournima) is a primarily Buddhist festival that is celebrated in most of South, Southeast and East Asia, commemorating the birth of the prince Siddhartha Gautama, who became the Buddha and founded Buddhism. According to Buddhist tradition and archaeologists, Gautama Buddha, c. 623 BCE, was born at Lumbini in Nepal. Buddha's mother was Queen Maya Devi, who delivered the Buddha while undertaking a journey to her native home, and his father was King Śuddhodana. The Mayadevi Temple, its gardens, and an Ashoka Pillar dating from 249 BCE mark the Buddha's birthplace at Lumbini.

The exact year of Buddha's birthday is based on the Sri Lankan convention, while several Asian lunisolar calendars ascribe to different lunar days. The date for the celebration of Buddha's birthday therefore varies from year to year in the Western Gregorian calendar, but it is usually celebrated in either April or May. During leap years, the birthday may be celebrated in June.

In South and Southeast Asia, the Buddha's birth is celebrated as part of Vesak, a festival that also celebrates the Buddha's enlightenment (on the day of the full moon, hence Sanskrit: पूर्णिमा pūrṇimā) and his mahaparinirvana. In Tibetan Buddhism, Buddha's birth (7th day of the 4th Month) is celebrated separately from Saga Dawa Duchen, the annual festival celebrating his enlightenment and mahaparinirvana (15th Day of the 4th Month). In East Asia, Vietnam and the Philippines, the enlightenment and death of the Buddha are observed as separate holidays.

== Date ==
The exact date of Buddha's Birthday is based on the Asian lunisolar calendars and is primarily celebrated in Vaisakha month of the Buddhist calendar and the Vikram Samvat Hindu calendar. This is the etymology behind the term Vesak. In modern-day India and Nepal, where the historical Buddha lived, it is celebrated on the full moon day of the Vaisakha month of the Buddhist calendar. In Theravada countries following the Buddhist calendar, it falls on the full moon, Uposatha day, typically in the 5th or 6th lunar month. In China, Korea, Vietnam and the Philippines, it is celebrated on the eighth day of the fourth month in the Chinese lunar calendar. The date varies from year to year in the Western Gregorian calendar but usually falls in April or May. In leap years it may be celebrated in June. In Tibet, it falls on the 7th day of the fourth month of the Tibetan calendar.

=== South and Southeast Asia and Mongolia ===
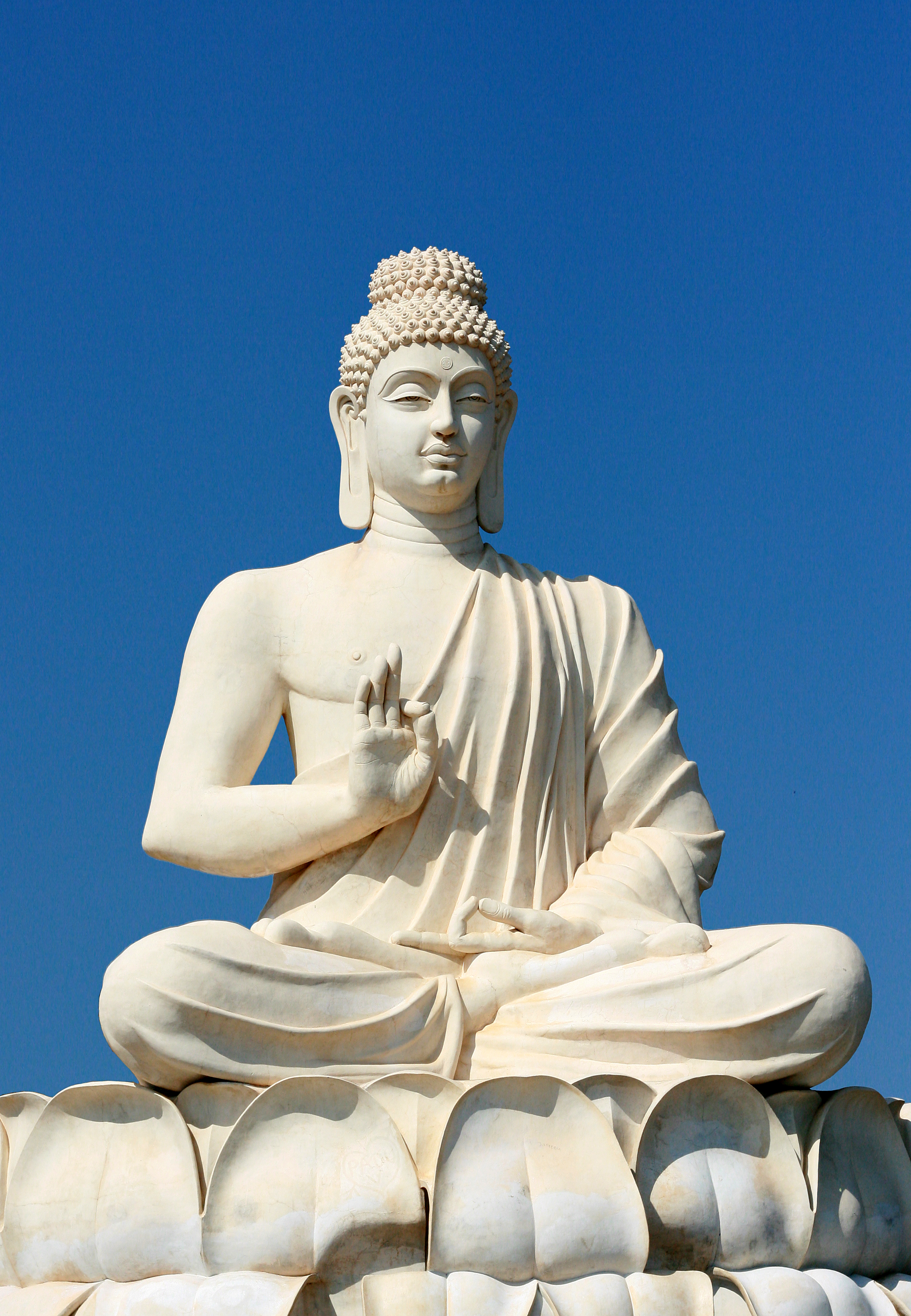
Buddha's statue located near Belum Caves, Andhra Pradesh, India

In South Asian and Southeast Asian countries (except Vietnam and the Philippines) as well as Mongolia, Buddha's birthday is celebrated on the full moon day of the Vaisakha month of the Buddhist calendar and the Hindu calendar, which usually falls in April or May of the Western Gregorian calendar. The festival is known as Buddha Purnima, as Purnima means full moon day in Sanskrit. It is also called Buddha Jayanti, with Jayanti meaning birthday in Sanskrit.

The corresponding Western Gregorian calendar dates varies from year to year:

- 2020: May 7
- 2021: May 19 (Bangladesh, Bhutan, Cambodia, Myanmar, Sri Lanka, Thailand and Tibet), May 26 (India, Indonesia, Nepal, Malaysia and Singapore)

=== East Asia, Vietnam and the Philippines ===
In many East Asian countries as well as Vietnam and the Philippines, Buddha's Birth is celebrated on the 8th day of the 4th month in the Chinese lunar calendar (in Japan since 1873 on April 8 of the Gregorian calendar), and the day is an official holiday in Hong Kong, Macau and South Korea. The date falls from the end of April to the end of May according to the Gregorian calendar.

The primarily solar Gregorian calendar date varies from year to year, and in the year 2021, it was on May 19.

==== Taiwan ====
In 1999 the Taiwanese government set Buddha's birthday as the second Sunday of May, the same date as Mother's Day.

==== Japan ====
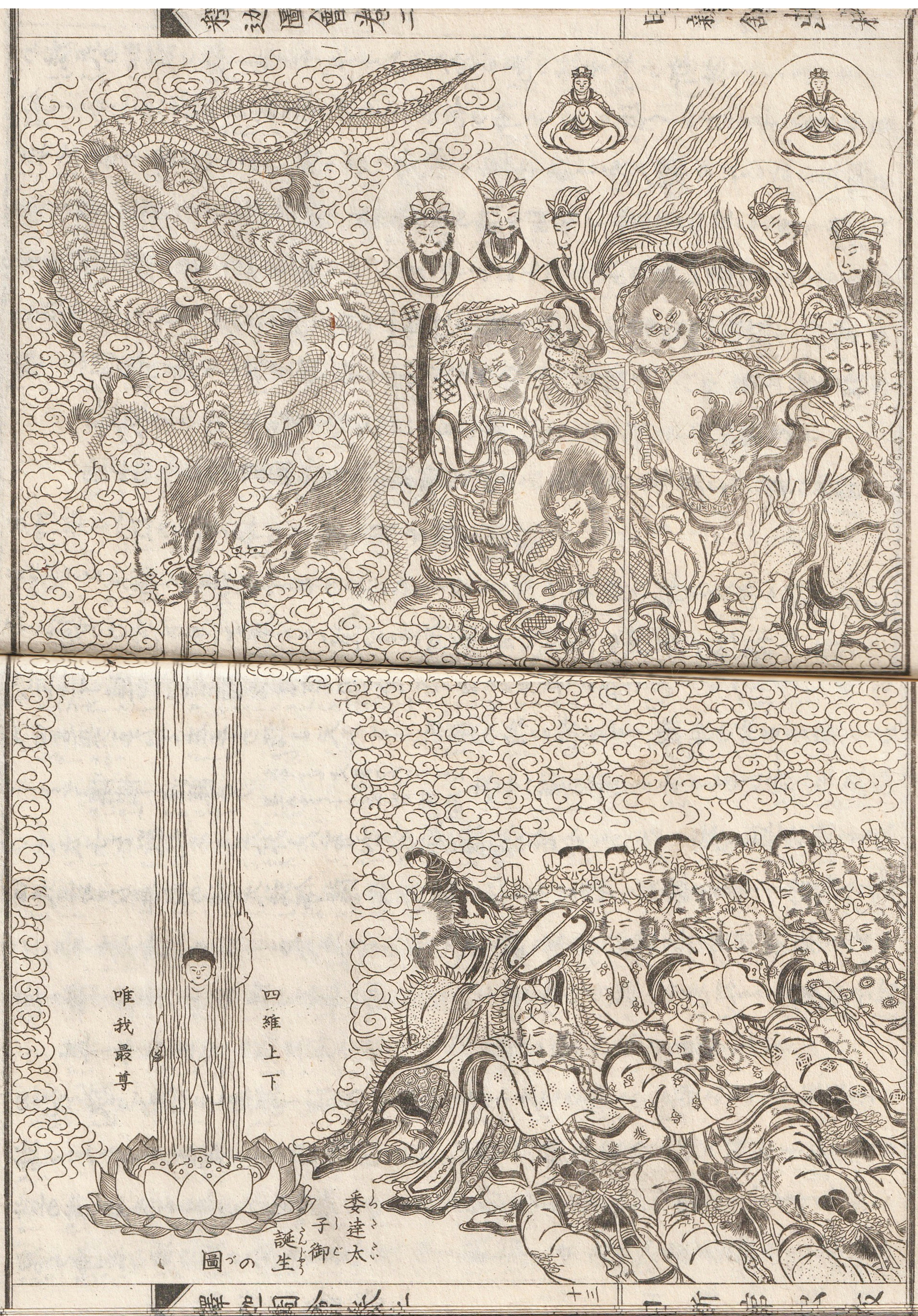
Illustration by Hokusai

As a result of the Meiji Restoration, Japan adopted the Gregorian calendar in lieu of the Chinese lunar calendar in 1873. However, it took approximately until 1945, the end of World War II, for religious festivities to adopt the new calendar. In most Japanese temples, Buddha's birth is now celebrated on the Gregorian and Buddhist calendar date 8 April; only a few (mainly in Okinawa) celebrate it on the orthodox Chinese calendar date of the eighth day of the fourth lunar month. It is quite possible however, that places with heavier Chinese influences such as Ryukyu may keep these old traditions.

== Place ==
Archeological evidence from Kapilvastu, where Śuddhodana's palace was located, was uncovered in 2021. In 2022, archaeologists from Durham University reported that while working in Nepal they uncovered evidence of a structure at the birthplace of the Buddha dating to the sixth century BCE, using a combination of radiocarbon and optically stimulated luminescence techniques.

== Celebrations in each country ==
=== Asia ===
==== Bangladesh ====
Buddha's birthday is a public holiday in Bangladesh and the event is called Buddho Purnima (বুদ্ধ পূর্ণিমা). On the days preceding Purnima, Buddhist monks and priests decorate Buddhist temples with colourful decorations and candles. On the day of the festival, the President and Prime Minister deliver speeches addressing the history and importance of Buddhism, and of religious harmony in the country. From noon onwards large fairs are held in and around the temples and viharas, selling Bengali food (largely vegetarian), clothes, and toys. Performances of Buddha's life are also presented. Buddhist monks teach celebrants about the Dharma and the Five Precepts (panchashila). Buddhists then attend a congression inside the monastery where the chief monk delivers a speech discussing the Buddha and the Three Jewels (tri-ratna), and about living the ideal life. Afterwards, a prayer to the Buddha is offered, and people then light candles and recite the Three Jewels and Five Precepts.

==== Bhutan ====
In Bhutan, Buddha Parinirvana is a national holiday and is also celebrated as Saga Dawa on the 15th day of the Saga Dawa (fourth month of the Tibetan calendar). Observation of the holy month begins from 1st day of the Saga Dawa, Vesak Month that culminates on the full moon day 15th of the month with celebrations of three holy events of Buddha's life; birth, enlightenment and Death (Mahaparinirvana). Throughout the Saga Dawa Vesak Month holy, virtuous and morally ethical activities flows in homes, temples, monasteries and public places. Devotees and followers follow strict vegetarian meals throughout the Saga Dawa month and avoid consumption of any non-vegetarian food. The Buddha parinirvana day also sees devotees visiting monastery to offer prayers and light butter lamps. People of various walk of life wear their national dress and go to monasteries to receive blessings from their guardian deity.

==== Cambodia ====
In Cambodia, Buddha's Birthday is celebrated as Visak Bochea and is a public holiday where monks around the country carry the Buddhist flag, lotus flowers, incense, and candles to acknowledge Vesak. People also take part in alms-giving to the monks.

==== Mainland China ====
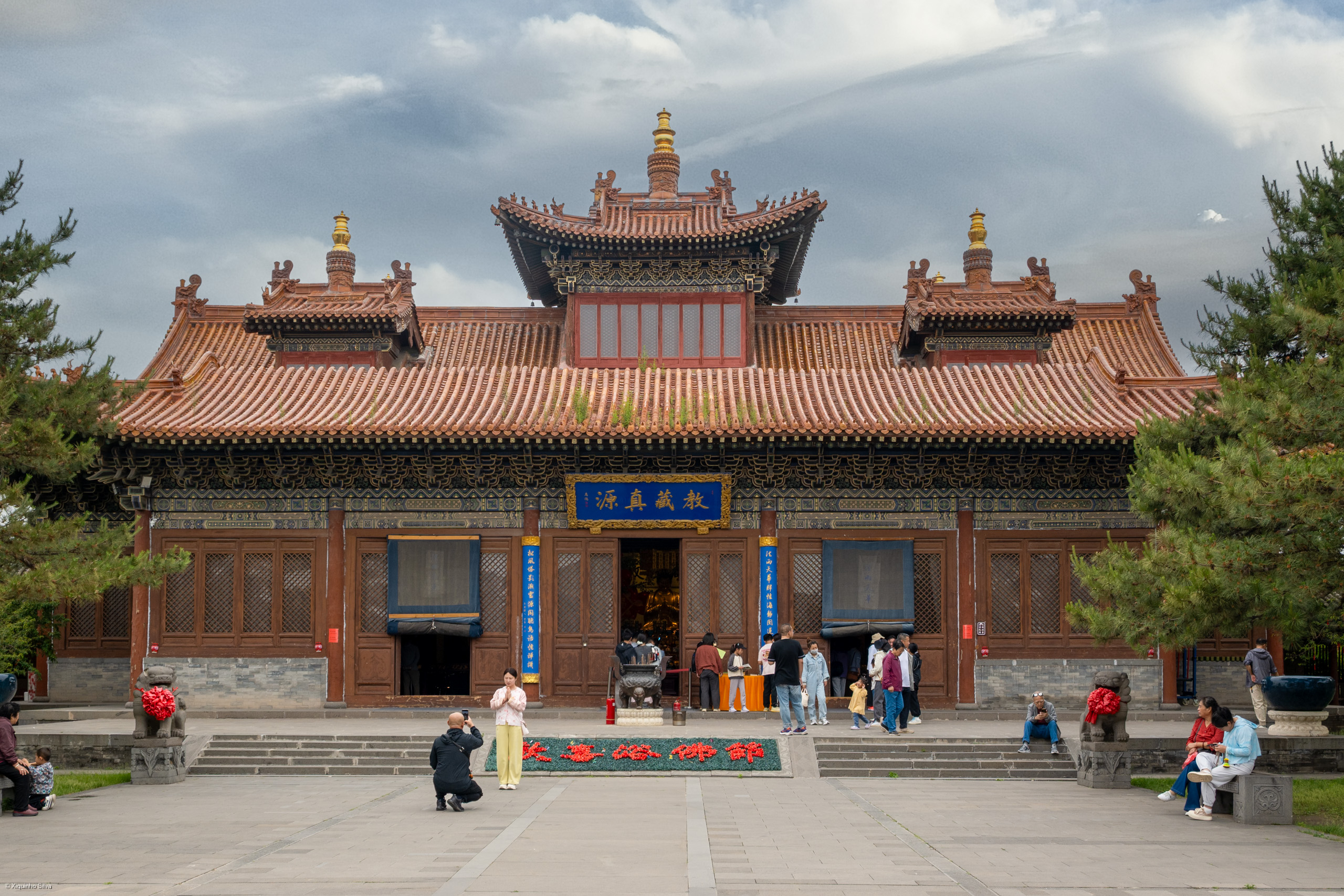
Formed the characters "Happy Bathing Buddha Festival" (Chinese: 歡喜浴佛節) with flowers on the grass to celebrate Buddha's Birthday at the Fahua Temple in Datong, Shanxi

In Mainland China, this day is generally and commonly called in Chinese 佛誕 (Fódàn), but also called "Yùfú Jié (浴佛節, "Bathing (Purifying) Buddha Festival"), Guànfó Huì (灌佛會, "Pouring on the Buddha Congregational Assembly"), Lóng-huá Huì (龍華會), Huáyán Huì (華嚴會)" or even " 衛塞節 (Wèisāi jié, "Vesak Day), 偉大的衛塞節花節偉大的滿月 (Wěidà de Wèisāi-jié Huā-jié Wěidà de Mǎnyuè, "Great Vesak Day Flower Festival Full Moon of Flower Moon")". Celebrations may occur in Buddhist temples where people may light incense and bring food offerings for the monks.

==== Hong Kong ====
In Hong Kong, Buddha's birthday is a public holiday. Lanterns are lit to symbolise the Buddha's enlightenment and many people visit the temple to pay their respects. The bathing of statues of the Buddha is a major feature of Buddha's birthday celebrations in the city. In Macau, all Buddhist temples in Macau will hold the "Lung4 Wa4 Wui5 (龍華會)" ritual ceremony, bathing the Buddha with "Ng5 Heung1 Seui2 (五香水 "Five Scented-Perfumed Water")", the festival is also a public holiday in Macau.

==== India ====
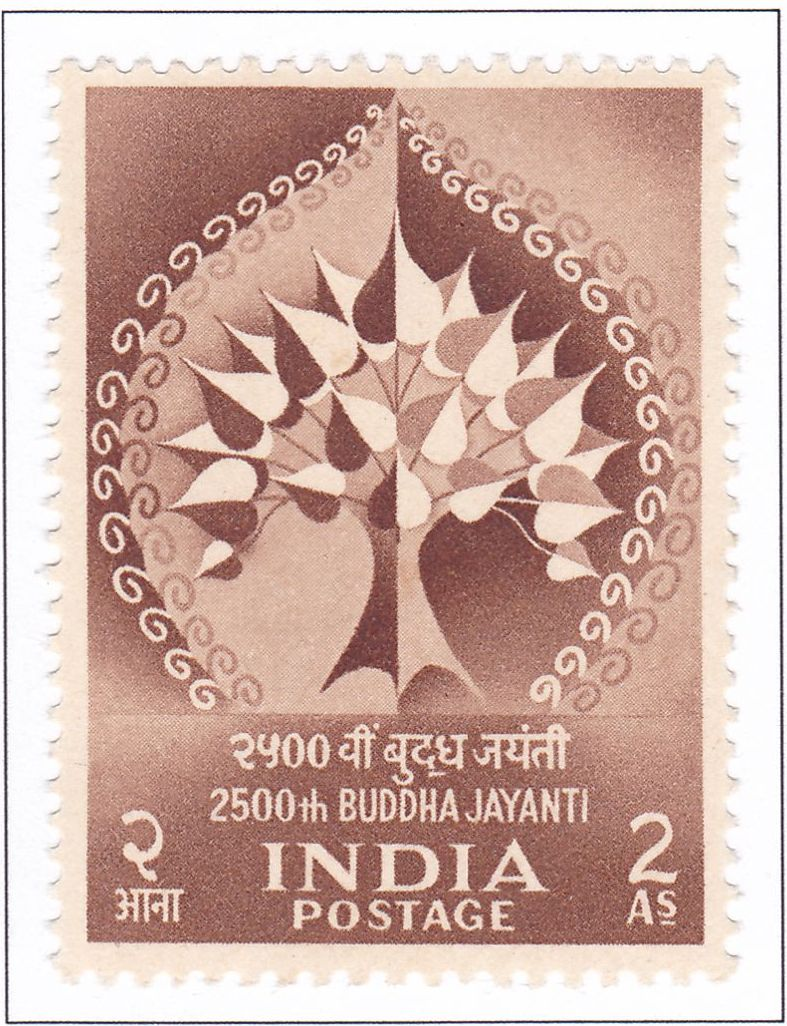
2500th Buddha Jayanti 2 anna postage stamp, 1956

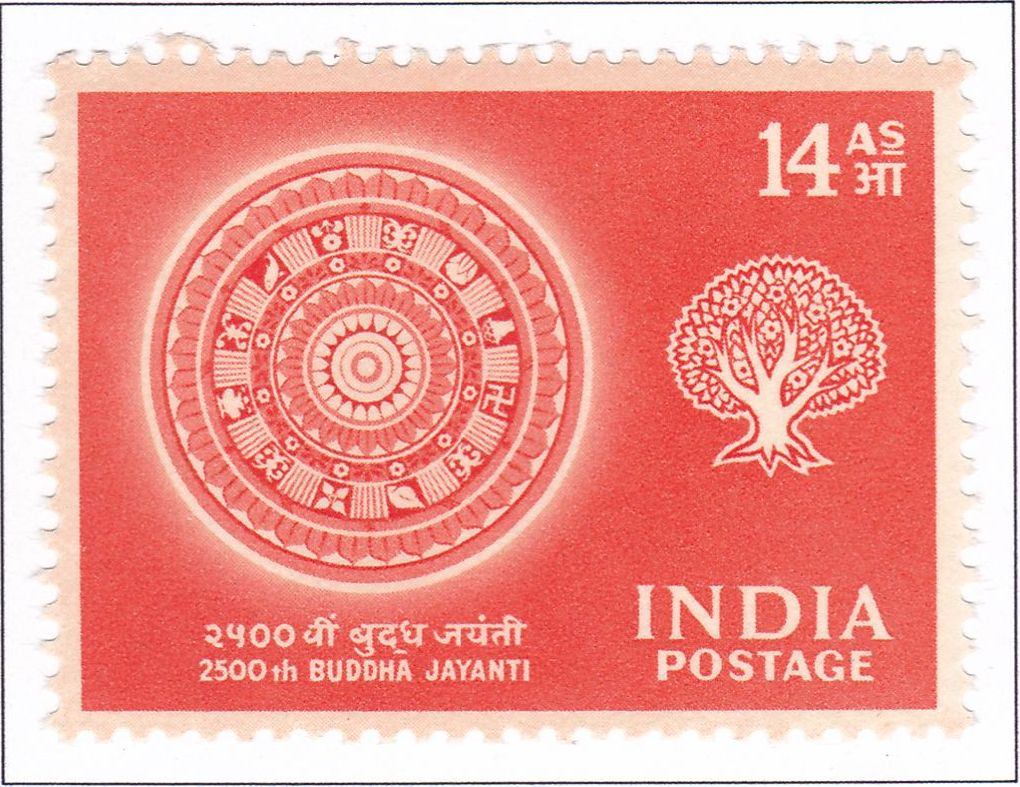
2500th Buddha Jayanti 14 Annas postage stamp, 1956

In India, the holiday is also known as Vesak. It commemorates the birth, enlightenment, and death (parinirvana) of Gautama Buddha in the Theravada, Tibetan, and Navayana traditions. The public holiday for Buddha Purnima in India was initiated by B. R. Ambedkar, when he was the Minister of Law and Justice. It is celebrated in many parts of India, especially in Maharashtra, where 77% of Indian Buddhists live).

Throughout the month of Vaishakha, holy and virtuous activities are conducted in homes, temples, monasteries, and public places. Devotees and followers take special precepts, the Mahayana Posadha, during the holy month and especially on the day of the full moon. Yogis also choose to do special types of meditation on this day, as it is said to be conducive to spiritual growth. Indian Buddhists go to viharas to observe a longer-than-usual, full-length Buddhist sutra. In the Theravada tradition, the dress code is white. Kheer, a sweet rice porridge, is commonly served to recall the story of Sujata, a milkmaid who offered the Buddha a bowl of milk porridge. At the Mahabodhi Temple in Bodh Gaya, Buddha Purnima is celebrated with great enthusiasm. This temple gets decorated with colored decorations. At the Bodhi tree, under which Gautama Buddha obtained enlightenment, devotees of Gautama Buddha perform special prayers. At the National Museum of India in New Delhi, the Buddha's sacred relics are open for public viewing.

==== Indonesia ====
In Indonesia, Buddha's Birthday is celebrated as Waisak and is a public holiday. A large procession beginning in Mendut in Java, and ends at Borobudur – the largest Buddhist temple in the world.

==== Japan ====
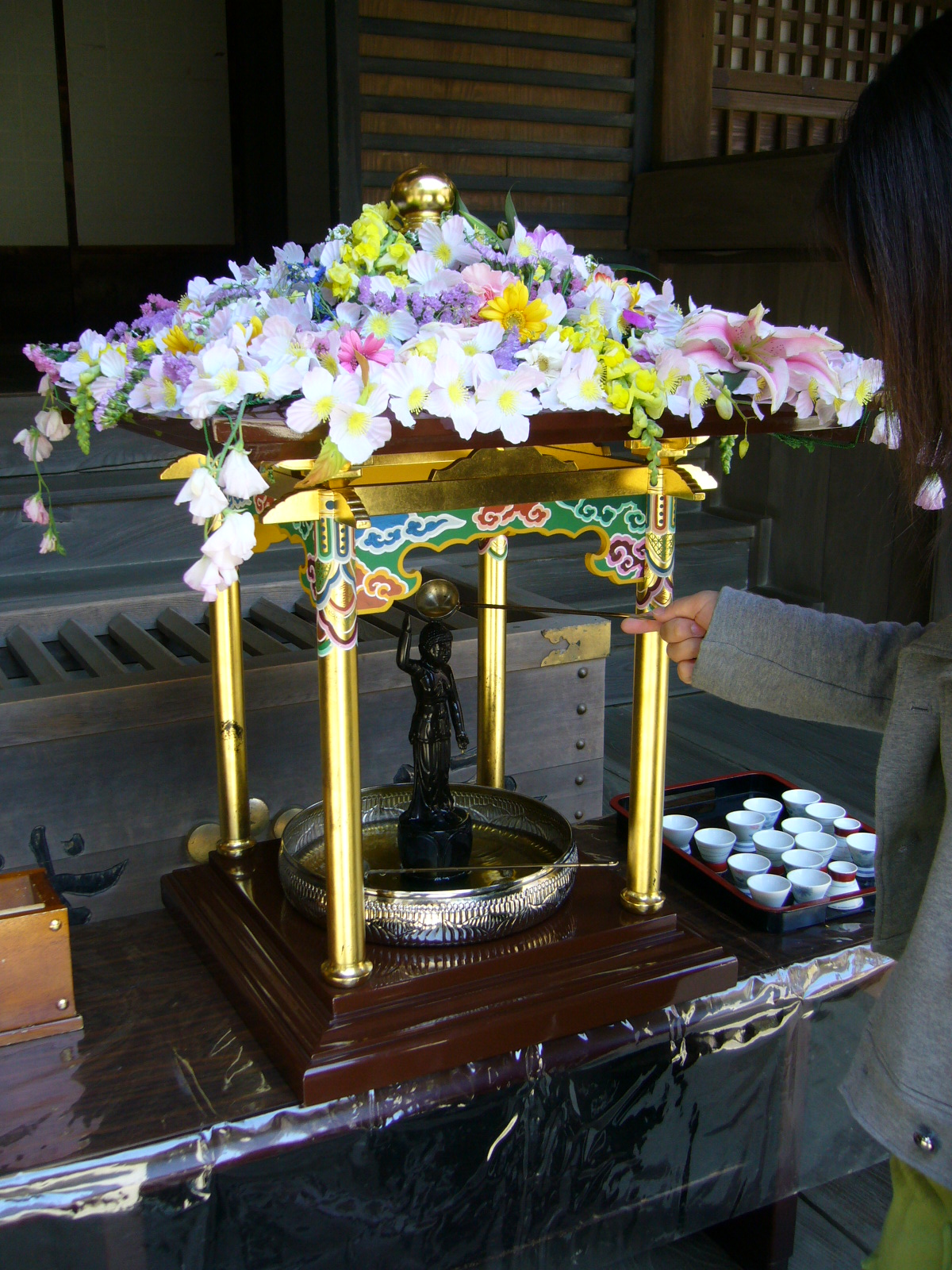
Hanamatsuri in Japan

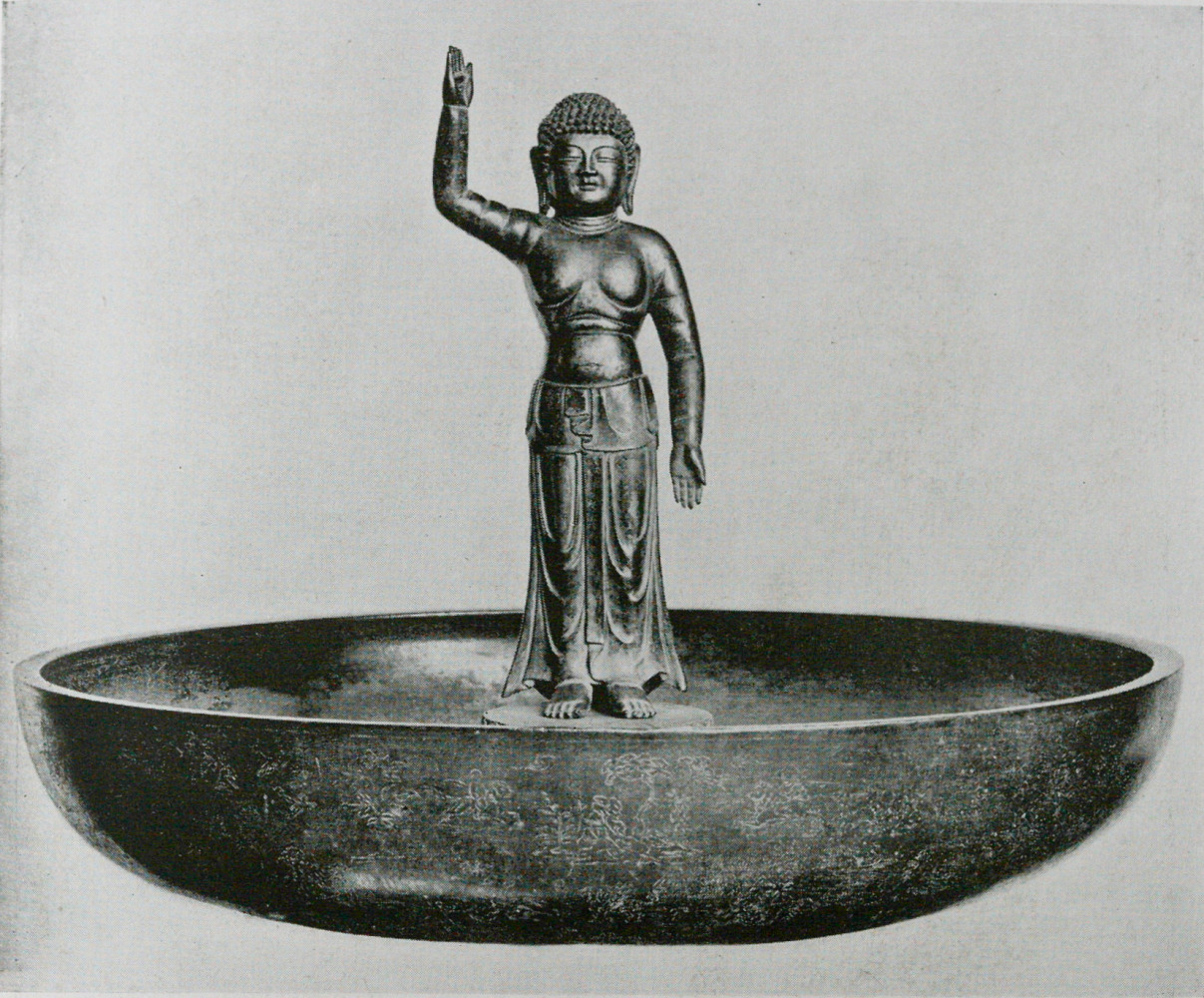
Shaka at Birth at Tōdaiji (National Treasure of Japan)

In Japan, Buddha's Birthday is known as Kanbutsu-e (Japanese: 灌仏会) or Hanamatsuri (Flower Festival) (Japanese: 花祭り) and is held on April 8. Buddha's birth is also celebrated according to the Buddhist calendar but is not a national holiday. On this day, all temples hold 降誕会 (Gōtan-e), 仏生会 (Busshō-e), 浴仏会 (Yokubutsu-e), 龍華会 (Ryūge-e) and 花会式 (Hana-eshiki). Japanese people pour ama-cha (a beverage prepared from Hydrangea serrata, a variety of hydrangea) on small Buddha statues decorated with flowers, as if bathing a newborn baby. The tradition of bathing the Buddha originated in China and was introduced to Japan where it was first held in Nara in 606. Lion dancing is also a major tradition practiced during Buddha's Birthday and has become associated with the festival in Japan.

==== Malaysia ====
In Malaysia, Buddha's Birthday is celebrated as Wesak Day and is a public holiday celebrated by the sizeable minority Buddhist population in the country. Temples across the country are decorated, and caged animals are set free. People engage in prayers, chanting, and alms-giving across the country.

==== Mongolia ====
In Mongolia, Buddha's Birthday is called (Mongolian Cyrillic: Багшийн Их Дүйцэн Өдөр, Burkhan Bagshiin Ikh Düitsen Ödör, "Lord Buddha's Great Festival Day"), is celebrated as "Ikh Duichen" and its date is determined by the Mongolian lunar calendar. As a result, the date falls in line with celebrations of Buddha's Birthday/Vesak in South and Southeast Asian countries as opposed to neighbouring East Asian countries. In December 2019, the popularly celebrated festival by many Mongolian Buddhists, was made a public holiday.

==== Myanmar ====
In Myanmar, Buddha's Birthday is celebrated as Full Moon of Kasun and is a public holiday. It is celebrated by watering the Bodhi tree and chanting. In large pagodas, music and dance is also performed as part of the celebrations.

==== Nepal ====
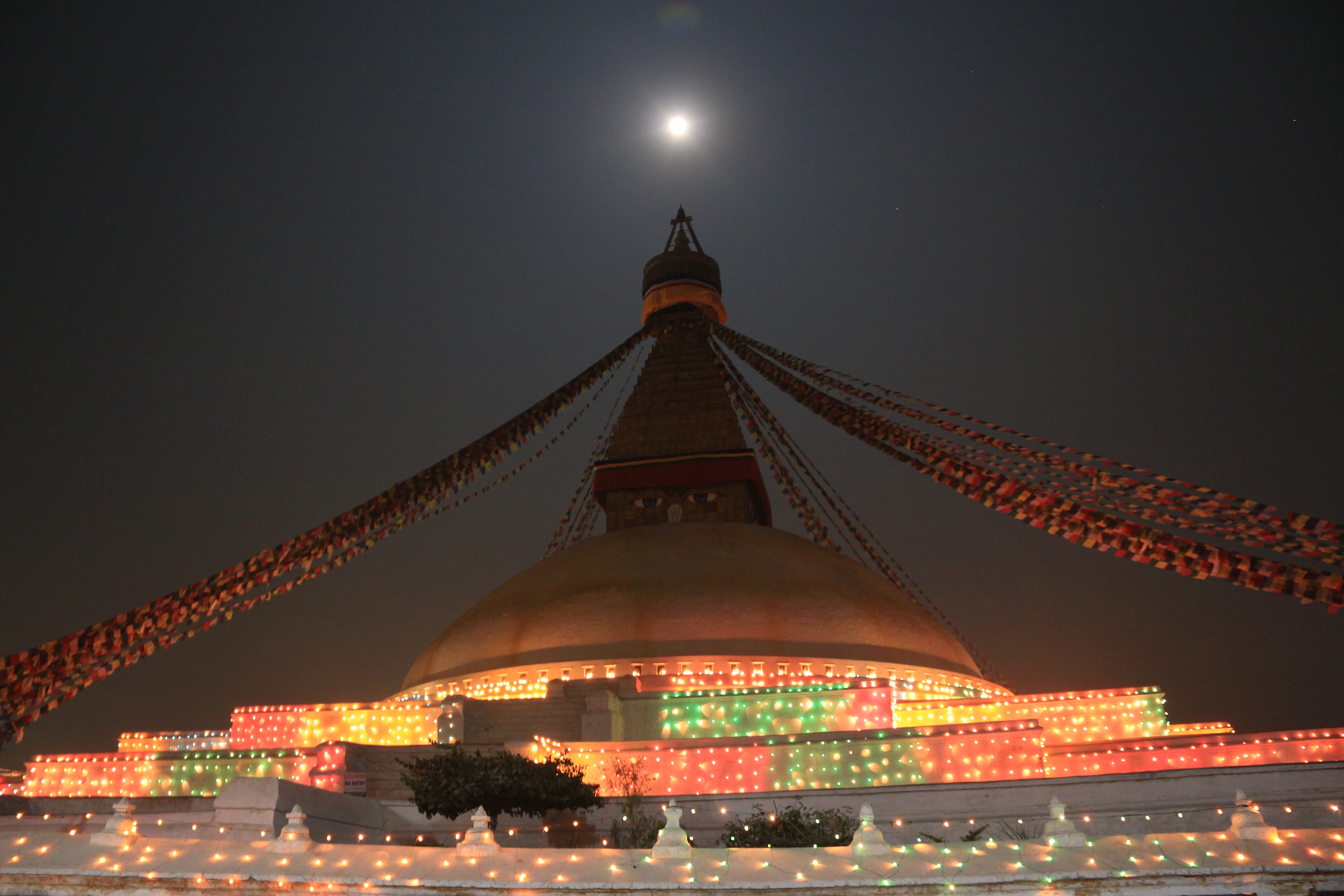
Colorful celebrations in Boudhanath Stupa, Nepal during the night of full moon in Buddha Purnima

In Nepal,the birthplace of Buddha, Buddha's birthday is celebrated on the full moon day of May, and is a national public holiday. The festival is known by various names, Buddha Jayanti, Buddha Purnima, Vaishakh Purnima, Saga Dawa, and Vesak. Purnima means full moon day in Sanskrit. Among the Newars of Nepal, especially from the Shakya clan of Newars, it is of great importance because they consider it as a continuation of the sage of the Śākyas- the clan that Lord Buddha's family belonged to. Thus, they celebrate the festival which is in their language known as Swānyā Punhi (स्वांया पुन्हि), the full moon day of flowers. The day marks not just the birth of Shakyamuni Gautama Buddha, but also the day of his Enlightenment and Mahaparinirvana.

The event is celebrated by gentle and serene fervour, keeping in mind the very nature of Buddhism. People, especially women, go to common Viharas to observe a rather longer-than-usual, full-length Buddhist sutra, something like a service. The usual dress is pure white. Non-vegetarian food is normally avoided. Kheer, sweet rice porridge is commonly served to recall the story of Sujata, a maiden who offered the Buddha a bowl of milk porridge.

Buddha Purnima is the biggest day for Buddhists because on this day, it is believed three important events of the Buddha's life took place: his birth, his attaining enlightenment, and his death, Paranirvana. This day is known as Thrice Blessed Festival.

==== North Korea ====
Buddha's Birthday is occasionally designated as a public holiday in North Korea and is known as Chopail (Korean: 초파일 Chopa-il; Hanja: 初八日, "the first 8th day (of the month in the Lunar Calendar)"). Designation of traditional Korean holidays as public holidays in North Korea are determined by the Cabinet a few days before the traditional holiday begins. Buddha's Birthday is a traditional festival in Korean culture, and was celebrated in Korea long before the division of the country. As a result, the festival is still celebrated in North Korea by the country's Buddhist population.

==== Philippines ====
In the Philippines, Buddha's Birthday is known as Kaarawan ni Buddha and usually has Chinese elements via its Chinese community. It is a public holiday. However, it can be celebrated by people of all religions. Like in China and Japan, Filipino people bathe statues of the Buddha.

==== Singapore ====
In Singapore, Buddha's birthday is celebrated as Vesak or Vesak Day and is a public holiday in the country. Buddhist temples hold celebrations and are decorated with Buddhist flags and flowers. Devotees also bring offerings to the temples.

==== South Korea ====
In South Korea, the birthday of Buddha is celebrated according to the Korean lunar calendar and is a national holiday. This day is called "Bucheo-nim o-shin nal" (Hangul: 부처님 오신 날) meaning "the day when the Buddha (Bucheo-nim) came", which is also called "Seok-ga T'an-shin-il" (Hangul: 석가탄신일, Hanja: 釋迦誕辰日), i.e. "the Birthday of Sakyamuni Buddha" and sometimes also called Chopail (Korean: 초파일 Chopa-il; Hanja: 初八日, "the first 8th day (of the month in the Lunar Calendar)"). Lotus lanterns hang in temples throughout the month and lanterns are hung in homes and in the streets. On the day of Buddha's birth, many temples provide free meals and tea to all visitors and organize large lantern festival called Yeondeunghoe (Hangul: 연등회, Hanja: 燃燈會, "Lotus Lantern Festival"). Breakfast and lunch are also provided, which often includes sanchae bibimbap. Buddha's Birthday is a popular holiday and folk celebration in Korea, and is often celebrated by people of all religious faiths.

==== Sri Lanka ====
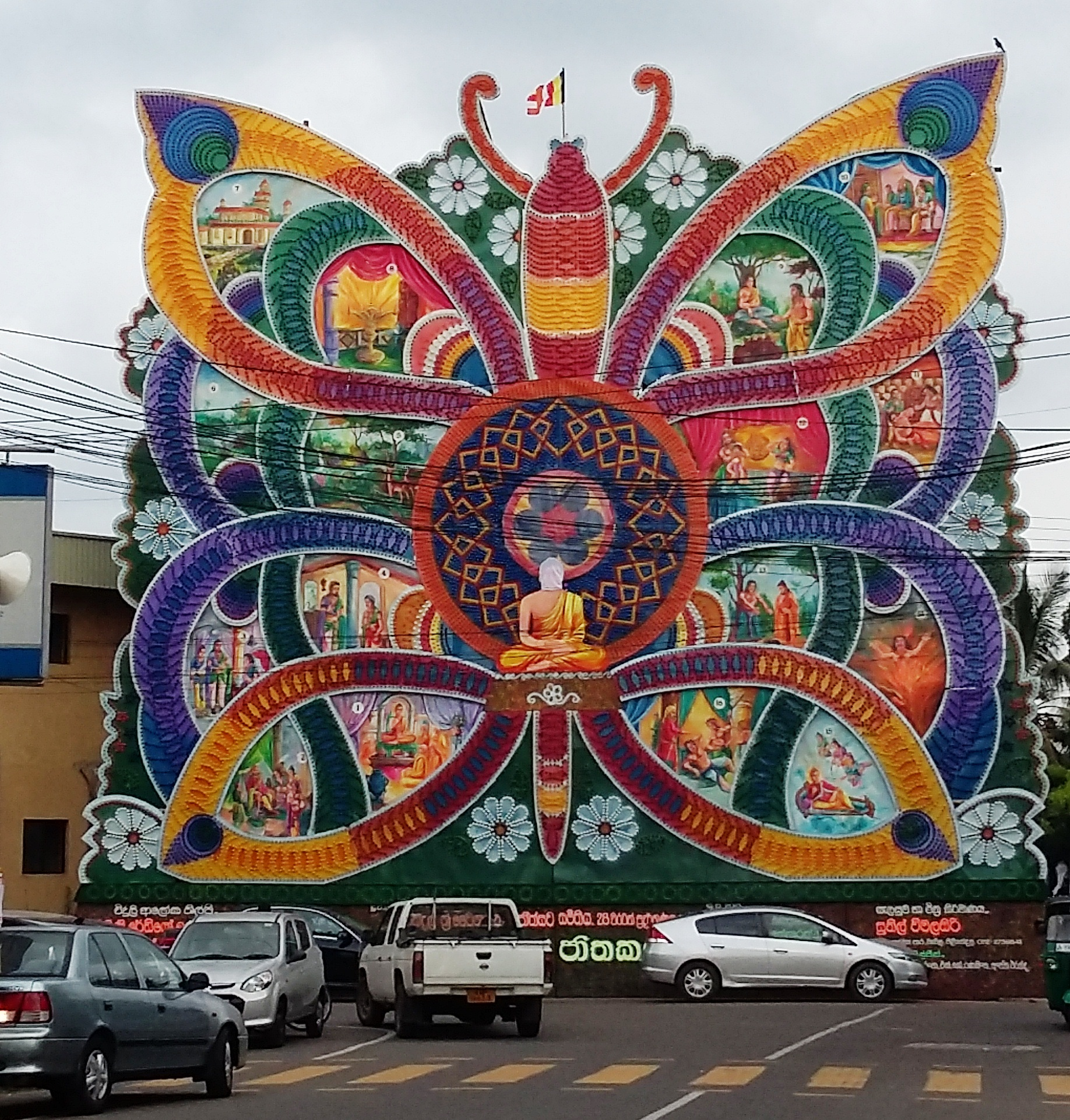
Vesak Thorana in Piliyandala, Sri Lanka

In Sri Lanka, Buddha's Birthday is celebrated as Vesak and is a public holiday celebrated on the first full moon day of the month of May. Its date is determined by the Buddhist lunar calendar. People engage in religious observances and decorate houses and streets with candles and paper lanterns as well as bamboo-framed lanterns. Dansalas is practised and refers to the free offering of food and drink to people. Devotional songs known as Bakthi Gee are sung, and decorative gateways called pandols are erected throughout the country. Temples around the country also hold celebrations, and devotees bring offerings and burn incense. Electric light displays that depict stories from the Buddha's life are also a notable part of Vesak celebrations in the country.

==== Taiwan ====
In Taiwan, after the initiation by the Buddhists and the general public, the "Guódìng Fúdàn Jié (Chinese: 國定佛誕節, "National Buddha's Birthday")" was jointly signed. Then in 1999, the Ministry of the Interior (Taiwan) officially announced the "Anniversary of the Buddha's Birthday (Chinese: 佛陀誕辰紀念日 Fótuó Dànchén Jìniàn Rì)" in the "Guódìng Jìniàn Rì (Chinese: 國定紀念日, "National Memorial Day")". Buddha's birthday is a national holiday. Devotees pour fragrant water over Buddha statues to symbolise the beginning of a fresh start in life.

==== Thailand ====
In Thailand, Buddha's birthday is celebrated as Visakha Puja and is a public holiday. People gather at temples to hear sermons, give donations and chant prayers.

==== Vietnam ====
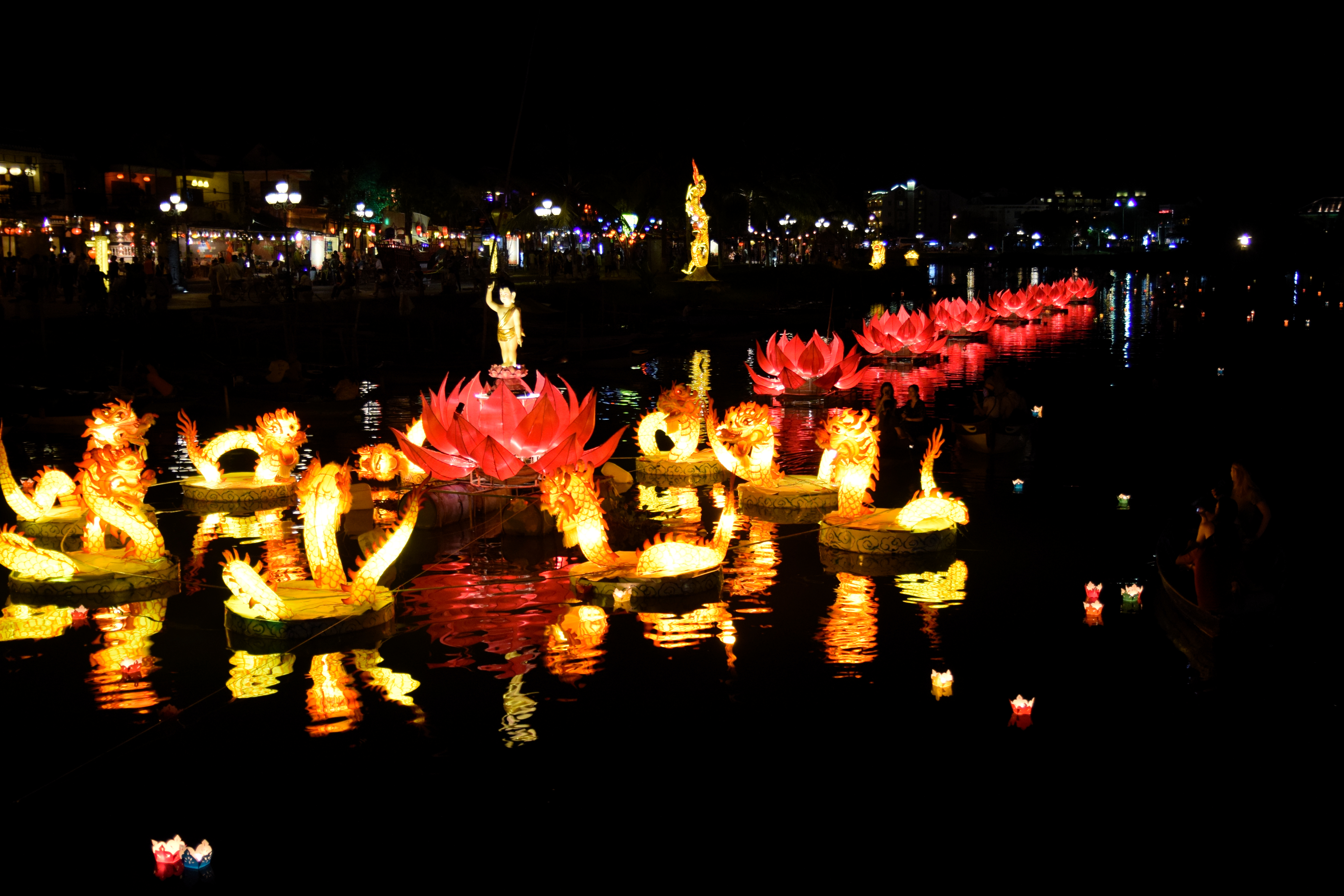
Water lanterns on the river on the occasion of Buddha's birthday in Hội An, Quảng Nam, Vietnam

In Vietnam, Buddha's birthday is called in Vietnamese, Lễ Phật Đản/Phật Đản (佛誕, "Birthday of the Buddha"), or Tam Hiệp and is celebrated throughout Vietnam. Many Buddhist temples hold celebrations that attract people from around the country, while pagodas around the country are decorated. From 1958 to 1975, the birthday of Buddha (on the 8th day of the 4th month in the Vietnamese calendar) was recognized as a national public holiday in South Vietnam, celebrated with floats and lantern parades on the streets. Buddha's Birthday is popular in Vietnam, but is not a public holiday.

==== List of names in languages ====
Buddha's Birthday

Chinese name
- Traditional Chinese: 佛誕
- Simplified Chinese: 佛诞
Transcriptions
Standard Mandarin
- Hanyu Pinyin: fódàn
Yue: Cantonese
- Jyutping: fat1 daan3
Southern Min
- Hokkien POJ: Hu̍t-á-seⁿ or Hu̍t-á-siⁿ

Vietnamese name
- Vietnamese alphabet: Phật Đản

Korean name
- Hangul: 부처님 오신 날
Transcriptions
- Revised Romanization: Bucheonim osin nal

Japanese name
- Kanji: 灌仏会
Transcriptions
- Revised Hepburn: Kanbutsu-e

Filipino name
- Tagalog: Kaarawan ni Buddha

=== Outside Asia ===
==== Australia ====
In Sydney, Buddha's birthday is celebrated at the Nan Tien Temple in Wollongong, while another celebration also organised by Nan Tien Temple is held at Darling Harbour, which features Buddha's birthday ceremony. A variety of vegetarian food is served, and culture stalls and multicultural performances are held, celebrating cultures from China, Japan, Vietnam, Korea, India, Malaysia, Sri Lanka, Australia. Other temples in the Fo Guang Shan Nan Tien Temple group in Australia also hold celebrations on the eighth day of the fourth month of the China lunar calendar. In Brisbane, the Buddha's Birthday Festival is held annually and features a variety of pan-Asian food, and performances from various cultures are held. It is a weekend-long festival which draws over 200,000 visitors. In Melbourne, the weekend-long festival called Buddha's Day and Multicultural Festival is held at Federation Square around April/May. In Perth, a two-day celebration also known as Buddha's Day and Multicultural Festival is held at Langley Park. Local Buddhist temples and smaller towns around the country such as Bendigo, Victoria also hold celebrations.

On the Australian external territory of Christmas Island, Buddha's Birthday is celebrated as "Vesak Day" and is celebrated alongside many other celebrations common in Australia and Malaysia as well as local celebrations of the island.

==== Brazil ====
Vesak (Hanamatsuri) is widely known and celebrated in Brazil due to the country's large Japanese community. Hanamatsuri has grown in popularity and also attracts interest from the wider non-Japanese Brazilian population. As a result, Hanamatsuri has become a consumerist culture phenomenon in the country and is sometimes locally known as Festa das Flores. Hanamatsuri is celebrated in the São Paulo neighbourhood of Liberdade which is home to the largest Japanese community outside of Japan. Hanamatsuri celebrations in Liberdade began in 1966 and includes a parade on Galvão Bueno street. Celebrations are also held at the suburb's major shopping centre, Liberdade Plaza.

==== Canada ====
In Toronto, three Buddhist temples representing the three main branches of Buddhism organize an annual event known as Vesak: Buddha's Birthday. It is held at Mississauga Celebration Square, and features a number of Buddhist-themed events and activities, as well as cultural acts from Asia, including China, Sri Lanka and Vietnam.

==== United States ====
The celebration of Buddha's Birthday in the United States differs from community to community, depending on ethnicity and nationality.

The Japanese celebration on 8 April has been significant in the Bay Area of California for some decades. In 1968 the first circumambulation of Mt. Tamalpais to celebrate Buddha's Birthday was conducted. Starting in 1969 at Tassajara Zen Mountain Center, Hana-Matsuri (花まつり, flower festival) was celebrated each spring. Dressed in formal black robes, the roughly 70 monks and students form a formal procession to the Horse Pasture with the leader periodically ringing a small, clear bell. A temporary stone altar was built under a huge oak tree in a gorgeous field of green grass and abundant wildflowers; a small statue of a baby Buddha was placed upon it in a metal basin. Then each person, in turn, approaches the altar, and ladle one thin-lipped bamboo dipperful of sweet green tea over the statue, bow, and walk to one side.

In New York, the International Lotus Lantern Parade has been a notable and successful annual event held at Union Square Park. The event celebrates the Buddha's birthday and Yeon Deung Hoe (연등회,燃燈會), a Korean lantern celebration that is held during Vesak. The festival features a number of Buddhist themed events and is started off by numerous Buddhist centers of Japanese, Korean and Sri Lankan origins for example.

Since 1963, the state of Hawaii has recognized 8 April of each year as "Buddha Day".

== See also ==
- Vesak
- Bun Festival – a festival held on the same day in Hong Kong.
- Hanami
- Holidays in Taiwan
- Holidays in Vietnam
- Holidays of Japan
- List of Buddhist festivals
- List of festivals in Asia
- Public holidays in Bangladesh
- Public holidays in Bhutan
- Public holidays in China
- Public holidays in Hong Kong
- Public holidays in India
- Public holidays in Macau
- Public holidays in Mongolia
- Public holidays in Nepal
- Public holidays in North Korea
- Public holidays in the Philippines
- Public holidays in South Korea
- Public holidays in Sri Lanka
