= Public holidays in Vietnam =

Public holidays in Vietnam are days when workers get the day off work. Prior to 2007, Vietnamese workers observed 8 days of public holiday a year, among the lowest in the region. On 28 March 2007 the government added the traditional holiday commemorating the mythical Hùng kings to its list of public holidays, increasing the number of days to 10. From 2019, Vietnamese workers have 13 public holidays a year. As in most other nations, if a holiday falls during the weekend, it is observed on the following Monday.

Public Holidays
Date	English name	Local name	Length (days)	Remarks
January 1	New Year's Day	Tết dương lịch	1	International public holiday
From the 2nd last day of the last lunar month to 5th day of the first lunar month	Vietnamese New Year (Tet)	Tết Nguyên Đán	7 (9 if 1st day of 1st lunar month falls on Mon-Wed)	Lunar New Year; Largest and most important holiday of the year, occurring around late January to early February
10th day of the 3rd lunar month	Hung Kings Commemorations	Giỗ tổ Hùng Vương	1 (3 if falls on Friday to Monday)	Commemoration of the ruling of ancient Hung Kings (2879 BC–258 BC), according to Vietnam's legend and history New holiday since 2007, occurring around April (adopted by the government on March 28, 2007)
April 30	Reunification Day	Ngày giải phóng miền Nam, thống nhất đất nước	1	Fall of Saigon and reunification of Vietnam in 1975 after the Vietnam War
May 1	International Workers' Day	Ngày quốc tế lao động	1	Also known as "Labor Day"; International public holiday in many former and current communist and socialist countries
September 2	National Day	Quốc khánh	2 (4 if falls on Friday to Tuesday)	On 2 September 1945, President Ho Chi Minh declared Vietnam's independence from France's and Japan's occupation, establishing the Democratic Republic of Vietnam
November 24	Vietnam Culture Day	Ngày Văn hóa Việt Nam	1	Encouraging creativity and spreading culture.

== Public holidays in Vietnam 2026 ==
Description	Date in 2026	Days
New Year Day	Thu, Jan 1 - Sun, Jan 4	4
Lunar New Year (Tet)	Sat, Feb 14 – Sun, Feb 22	9
Hung Kings Commemoration Day	Sat, Apr 25 – Mon, Apr 27	3
Reunification Day and International Labor Day	Thu, Apr 30 – Sun, May 3	4
Independence Day	Sat, Aug 29 – Wed, Sep 2	5
Vietnam Culture Day	Tue, Nov 24	1
Total		26

== Other holidays and festivals ==
There are also many other holidays and festivals that are held in Vietnam either nationally or locally. These holidays and festivals do not involve days off but are widely observed and celebrated across the country.

=== Gregorian calendar ===
Other Gregorian-calendar holidays and observances
Date	English name	Local name	Remarks
January 9	Vietnamese Students' Day	Ngày Học sinh – Sinh viên Việt Nam	Commemorating the death of Trần Văn Ơn in 1950. Adopted by the National Students' Congress in 1950; Traditional day of Vietnamese Students' Association; Honors students
February 3	Communist Party of Vietnam Foundation Anniversary	Ngày thành lập Đảng	Commemorating the foundation of the Communist Party of Vietnam in 1930
February 27	Vietnamese Physicians' Day	Ngày Thầy thuốc Việt Nam	On that day in 1955, Ho Chi Minh delivered his address on the occasion of Medical Staff Conference. Adopted by the Council of Ministers in 1985; Honors physicians, doctors and people working in the medical industry
March 8	International Women's Day	Ngày Quốc tế Phụ nữ	The day of common struggle of working women all over the world is to show the will to fight of women all over the world to fight for national independence, democracy, peace and social progress; for the welfare of women and children Also commemorating the uprising of Trưng Sisters (AD 40), the first two national heroines
March 26	Ho Chi Minh Communist Youth Union Foundation Day	Ngày Thành lập Đoàn Thanh niên Cộng sản Hồ Chí Minh	Foundation of Ho Chi Minh Communist Youth Union in 1930, formerly Peasants’ Day (Ngày Nông dân Việt Nam) in South Vietnam
April 21	Vietnam Book Day	Ngày Sách Việt Nam	Encouraging and develop reading movements in the community; Raising awareness of the people about the great significance and importance of reading to the development of knowledge, skills and development of thinking, educating and training human personality Adopted by the Government in 2014; Also commemorating the publication of Ho Chi Minh's Đường kách mệnh in 1927
April 27	Vietnamese Architect's Day	Ngày kiến trúc sư việt nam	On April 27, 1948, President Ho Chi Minh established the Vietnam Architects Union during the First Congress in Vinh Yen province. In 2011, the government set April 27 as the Vietnamese Architecture Day, honoring the entire Vietnamese architectural field. It is celebrated annually to recognize the advancements and successes of the architectural community in Vietnam.
May 7	Dien Bien Phu Victory Day	Ngày Chiến thắng Điện Biện Phủ	Victory of the People's Armed Forces against France in the Battle of Dien Bien Phu (1954)
May 9	Victory over Fascism Day	Ngày Chiến thắng Phát xít	Anniversary of the conclusion of the Second World War in Europe
May 19	President Ho Chi Minh's Birthday	Ngày sinh Chủ tịch Hồ Chí Minh	The birth of Ho Chi Minh in 1890
June 1	International Children's Day	Ngày Quốc tế Thiếu nhi	Formerly the Police Day (Ngày Cảnh sát Quốc gia) in South Vietnam
June 28	Vietnamese Family Day	Ngày Gia đình Việt Nam	
July 27	Vietnamese War Invalids and Martyrs’ Day	Ngày Thương binh Liệt sĩ	
August 19	August Revolution Commemoration Day	Ngày Cách mạng Tháng 8	Commemorating the August Revolution of 1945 and the foundation of the Vietnamese People's Public Security; Honors those serves in the police Considered as the unofficial Victory over Japan Day in Vietnam
October 10	Capital Liberation Day	Ngày Giải phóng Thủ đô	
October 13	Vietnamese Entrepreneur's Day	Ngày Doanh nhân Việt Nam	
October 20	Vietnamese Women's Day	Ngày Phụ nữ Việt Nam	Commemorating the foundation of Vietnamese Women's Association in 1930; Honors women and mothers
November 20	Vietnamese Teacher's Day	Ngày Nhà giáo Việt Nam	School holiday. Honors those who are teachers
December 22	National Defence Day (People's Army of Viet Nam Foundation Anniversary)	Ngày hội quốc phòng toàn dân (ngày thành lập Quân đội nhân dân Việt Nam)	Commemorating the foundation of the People's Army of Vietnam in 1944.

=== Vietnamese calendar (Âm lịch Việt Nam) ===
Other Vietnamese-calendar holidays and observances
Date (in Vietnamese calendar)	English name	Local name	Remarks
15 of 1st month	Tết Nguyên Tiêu	Tết Nguyên Tiêu, Tết Thượng Nguyên (Rằm tháng giêng)	Full moon of the 1st month of the year. Poets' Day; Buddhist festival
3 of 3rd month	Tết Hàn Thực	Tết Hàn Thực	Commemorating the death of the Jin nobleman Jie Zitui in the 7th century BC under the Zhou dynasty in China
15 of 4th month	Buddha's Birthday	Lễ Phật Đản; Lễ Vesak	Birthday, enlightenment and death of Gautama Buddha (born in 563 BC or 480 BC in Lumbini) - the founder of Buddhism; Formerly held on April 8 (in Chinese calendar) until 1959. Buddhist festival, former public holiday of Vietnam until 1975
5 of 5th month	Tết Đoan Ngọ	Tết Đoan Ngọ	The day the sun is closest to the Earth - overlapping with the Summer solstice Also called the festival of eliminating insects and pests to protect the farms
15 of 7th month	Tết Trung Nguyên	Lễ Vu Lan, Tết Trung Nguyên and Lễ Xá tội vong nhân (Rằm tháng Bảy)	Full moon of the 7th month of the year Commemorating ghosts and spirits of the deceased ancestors Paying tribute and respect to father and mother Buddhist festival
12 of 8th month	Theater Day	Ngày Giỗ tổ Sân khấu	
15 of 8th month	Tết Trung Thu	Tết Trung Thu (Rằm tháng Tám)	Also called Children's Festival; Full moon of the 8th month of the year Celebrating a successful harvest
23 of 12th month	Ông Công and Ông Táo Festival	Lễ cúng Ông Công, Ông Táo về trời	Departure of Earth God and Kitchen God from Earth to Heaven to meet the Ngọc Hoàng, marking the end of the year
