= Obiit =

In medieval Christianity, an obiit was an annual endowed service commemorating the dead. Feast days for patron saints were often reserved for endowed masses associated with the obiit, sometimes in a chantry.

== Background ==
The practice has its origin in the recitation of the names of living and dead Christians (part of the intercessory prayers of the Canon of the Mass). As these lists grew in length separate ceremonies became necessary.

Though many obiit vigils were of the endowed sort, more modest collective obiit was available for parishioners who could not afford an endowment.

== Liturgy ==
The liturgy used for obiit ceremonies with the Office and Mass for the Dead. It began with Vespers and Matins followed by Commendations. At dawn a series of psalms and prayers were read, then before the final Requiem Mass service, there might be a procession to the grave of the deceased.

== Food and drink ==
Like most medieval social and community gatherings, shared food and drink were a feature of many obiit vigils. Guilds gathered for the obiit vigils of their members and benefactors, and shared food and drink were common place at these gatherings. Bread, cheese and ale were given out in the guild chapel at an obiit held in 1442 for the parker of Fulbrook (meaning park-keeper in Middle English) at the guild of the Holy Cross at Stratford-upon-Avon. In 1533 cakes, comfits, wine, ale and cheese were distributed at The Trinity Guild of Coventry for the obiit of alderman Nicholas Burwey.
