= List of VTV dramas broadcast in 2009 =

This is a list of VTV dramas released in 2009.

←2008 - 2009 - 2010→

== VTV Tet dramas ==
These single-episode dramas air on VTV channels during Tet holiday.

=== VTV1 ===
Broadcast	Title	Eps.	Prod.	Cast and crew	Theme song(s)	Genre	Notes
26 Jan	Kén dâu như ý (Agreeable Bride)	1	VFC	Lê Cường Việt (director); Hoàng Nhuệ Giang (writer); Minh Tiệp, Lê Phương Mai...		Comedy, Family	Airs 21:30, 1st Tet holiday
28 Jan	Ớt nào chẳng cay (Lovey Jealousy)	1	VFC	Đỗ Gia Chung (director); Nguyễn Ngân Hà (writer); Bá Anh, Trương Thu Hà, Đỗ Quỳnh Hoa, Lê Quốc Thắng, Ngọc Tuyết, Nguyễn Thu Hà, Kim Bình, Minh Trang, Mạnh Cường, Mạnh Hà...	Xuân yêu thương (Lovey Spring) by Pha Lê	Comedy, Family	Airs 21:10, 3rd Tet holiday

=== VTV3 ===
Broadcast	Title	Eps.	Prod.	Cast and crew	Theme song(s)	Genre	Notes
26 Jan	Yêu chạy (Rush Love)	1	VFC	Vũ Minh Trí (director); Đặng Diệu Hương (writer); Công Lý, Trung Hiếu, Tuấn Minh, Hồng Hạnh...		Comedy, Romance	Airs 21:00, 1st Tet holiday

== VTV1 Weeknight Prime-time dramas ==
These dramas air from 20h10 to 21h, Monday to Friday on VTV1.

- Note: Starting on April 22, the time slot was split in two ('Monday to Wednesday' & 'Thursday and Friday') in order to air 2 dramas per week instead of only one as before.

Broadcast	Title	Eps.	Prod.	Cast and crew	Theme song(s)	Genre	Notes
4 Feb-17 Mar	Ngõ lỗ thủng (The Lane of Loopholes)	29	VFC	Trần Quốc Trọng (director); Đặng Diệu Hương (writer); Đỗ Kỷ, Phú Kiên, Dũng Nhi, Hồng Nhung, Ngô Duy Phương, Trần Quốc Trọng, Phương Khanh, Tùng Dương, Trịnh Thu Hà, Trung Hiếu, Trần Hạnh, Đức Trung, Thanh Thủy, Bích Khang, Phương Loan, Thanh Hiền, Bạch Diện, Lý Thanh Kha, Trần Nhượng, Ánh Ngọc, Đình Chiến, Hạ Thiên Tâm, Tiến Bỉnh, Văn Báu, Thi Nhung, Tô Kim Phụng, Hoàng Hải, Văn Dũng, Mậu Hòa, Văn Lâm...	Tiễn biệt những ngày buồn (Farewell Moody Days); Poet by Trung Trung Đỉnh; Music by Trọng Đài; Performed by Mai Hoa	Drama, Political, Historical	Based on novels 'Tiễn biệt những ngày buồn' and 'Ngõ lỗ thủng' by Trung Trung Đỉnh
18-25 Mar	Chuyện thám tử (Detective Story)	6	VFC	Bùi Thọ Thịnh (director); Phạm Thanh Long (writer); Hoàng Anh Vũ, Diễm Hằng, Đức Anh, Hải Anh, Bích Ngọc, Hồng Sơn, Minh Tuấn, Xuân Tiên, Quang Lâm, Mai Ngọc Căn...	'Chuyện thám tử' theme song by Hoàng Nghiệp & Xuân Hương	Comedy, Crime, Youth	
26 Mar-21 Apr	Đi qua bóng tối (Overcome the Darkness)	18	VFC	Vũ Minh Trí (director); Đặng Minh Châu (writer); Huỳnh Minh Thủy, Hoàng Dũng, Minh Châu, Ngọc Thoa, Trần Hạnh, Quang Ánh, Trúc Mai, Cường Việt, Đức Thuận, Trần Đức, Khôi Nguyên, Huyền Thanh, Văn Bích, Kim Phụng, Tiến Minh, Đào Hoàng Yến, Quốc Quân, Quý Hải...	Đi qua bóng tối (Overcome the Darkness) by Tiến Minh; Để mãi có nhau (To Have Each Other Forever) by Tuyết Mai	Drama, Crime	

=== Monday-Wednesday dramas ===
Broadcast	Title	Eps.	Prod.	Cast and crew	Theme song(s)	Genre	Notes
27 Apr-21 Jul	Có lẽ nào ta yêu nhau (Perhaps Love)	37	BHD	Tống Thành Vinh (director); Nguyễn Hữu Thị Tường Vy (writer); Ngọc Quyên, Trịnh Thăng Bình, Anh Thư, Tommy Trần, Bằng Lăng, Diễm My, Hồng Hạnh, Trung Dũng, Mai Huỳnh, Tường Vy, Quỳnh Trang, Hoài Trang, Dương Cẩm Lynh...	Ta đã yêu trong mưa gió (We Fell In Love Amongst The Thunderstorm) by Thủy Tiên	Drama, Family	Based on Korean drama 'Mothers and Sisters' (2000)
10 Aug-6 Oct	Tìm lại chính mình (Finding Myself)	25	Đông A Pictures	Trần Lực (director); Chu Lai, Bảo Khánh, Tống Phương Dung (writers); Kiều Thanh, Bảo Kỳ, Vũ Phan Anh, Đỗ Nhật Nam, Quang Sự, Hữu Phương, Linh Linh, Văn Lượng, Thái An, Tiến Việt, Phú Thăng, Mỹ Hạnh, Lan Hương 'Bông', Trần Kiếm, Vân Anh, Tuấn Quang, Thùy Linh, Trần Thy, Minh Nguyệt, Quang Vinh, Phương Hạnh, Bình Xuyên, Kim Yến, Thanh Hương...	Hãy tin - Hãy yêu (To Believe and to Love) by Ngọc Anh	Drama, Crime	Adapted from the short story 'Như cánh diều bay' (Like a Flying Kite) by Trung Phương
12 Oct 2009- 4 Feb 2010	Đại gia đình (The Family)	48	Phước Sang Film	Trần Quang Đại (director); Ngọc Linh (writer); Hùng Minh, Minh Đức, Hà Xuyên, Việt Anh, Mai Thanh Dung, Hà Kiều Anh, Chi Bảo, Bình Minh, Thanh Thúy, Quyền Linh, Thanh Mai, Ngọc Trinh, Quốc Trường, Kim Thư, Phước Sang, Minh Trang, Cao Minh, Phi Phụng, Công Hậu, Lê China, Lâm Trung Hiền, Kim Phương, Hoài Trung, Phương Dung, Xuân Thủy, Tấn Hoàng, Tiểu Bảo Quốc...	Giấc mơ ban ngày (Day Dream) & Blue tình (Blue Love) by Mai Trang	Family, Drama	Delayed 3 eps due to events. Originally comprises 2 part (108 eps) but only part 1 aired on VTV.

=== Thursday-Friday dramas ===
Broadcast	Title	Eps.	Prod.	Cast and crew	Theme song(s)	Genre	Notes
22 Apr-4 Aug	Started with the playback of Xin lỗi tình yêu (Sorry My Love). The drama was first released on HTV9 channel in 2007. Note: Ep 1 airs on Wednesday. Delayed 3 eps on May 7, June 4–5. Ep 22 to the end (Ep 34) air on Monday to Friday (July 22-August 4).						
5 Aug-16 Oct	Followed by the playback of Tình án (Love Case). The drama was first released on HTV9 channel in early the same year. Note: Episode 20 airs on Wednesday, October 7						
22 Oct-6 Nov	Phá vỡ im lặng (Breaking the Silence)	10	Điệp Vân Film, CSAGA and UNODC	Hoàng Nhuận Cầm (director); Đoàn Quốc Thắng, Hoàng Nhuận Cầm (writers); Quốc Trị, Điệp Vân, Hoàng Cúc, Tiến Đạt, Tạ Minh Thảo, Minh Nguyệt, Ngọc Tản, Đức Hải, Phan Ngọc Lan, Bá Cường, Hoàng Vy, Hà Quyên, Minh Tâm, Bằng Linh, Nam Cường, Tuấn Dương, Tiến Lộc, Quỳnh Trang, Mẫn Đức Kiên, Vũ Phan Anh, Đức Minh, Tiến Mộc, Phương Khanh, Nguyễn Chung, Thanh Xuân, Phương Hạnh, Tùng Anh, Hà Anh...	Đi cấy (Transplanting); Folk song	Drama, Crime, Propa-ganda	Aired 2 eps per night, 30 min per episode. Delayed 2 eps on Oct 30.
12 Nov-18 Dec	Followed by the playback of Hộ chiếu vào đời (Passport to Life). The drama was first released on HTV9 channel in 2007.						
24 Dec 2009- 7 May 2010	Nhà có nhiều cửa số 2 (House of Many Windows 2)	27	VFC and MOH	Phi Tiến Sơn (director); Khải Hưng, Phi Tiến Sơn, Đỗ Trí Hùng, Vũ Nguyệt Ánh (writers); Lê Mai, Tiến Đạt, Quế Hằng, Huyền Trang, Hoàng Công, Vi Cầm, Hồng Đăng, Mạnh Quân, Thanh Huyền, Tiến Lộc, Hoàng Giang, Đức Hiệp, Đàm Hoàng, Mạnh Trường, Thúy Hạnh, Quốc Quân, Văn Bích, Tùng Dương...	Tìm về đại dương (Way Back to the Ocean) by Hà Anh Tuấn & Phương Linh	Drama, Propa-ganda	Delayed 5 weeks in order to air Tet dramas (4 Feb - 5 Mar 2010)

== VTV3 Weeknight Prime-time dramas ==
=== Monday-Wednesday dramas ===
These dramas air from 21h to 21h50, Monday to Wednesday on VTV3.

Broadcast	Title	Eps.	Prod.	Cast and crew	Theme song(s)	Genre	Notes
1 Apr-1 Jul	Lập trình cho trái tim (Programming for the Heart)	40; Pt.1: 25e Pt.2: 15e	FPT Media	Nguyễn Mạnh Hà/Phạm Nhuệ Giang (directors); Nguyễn Thủy, Minh Anh, Thu Hà, Đinh Thủy, Thanh Nhàn (writer); Nguyễn Quang Lập (editor); Quỳnh Nga, Minh Tiệp, Hồng Quang, Minh Hà, Nguyễn Thị Lan Hương, Đồng Thanh Bình, Đức Khuê, Uy Linh, Thành Trung, Trần Hiếu, Trương Thuận, Ngô Huy Hoàng, Huyền Thanh, Hồng Hải, Linh Chi, Tuấn Dương, Hồng Liên, Vũ Linh, Mai Mai, Minh Tân, Nguyễn Thanh Tùng, Thanh Huyền, Hà Đan, Hà Linh...	Lập trình cho trái tim em 1 (Programming For My Heart 1) by Lan Hương; Lập trình cho trái tim em 2 (Programming For My Heart 2) by Mỹ Dung	Romance, Comedy, Drama	
6 Jul 2009- 1 Mar 2010	Cô nàng bất đắc dĩ (Unavoidable Girl)	100	VTV and Kiet Tuong LLC	Hồng Ngân/Xuân Cường (directors); Trần Thùy Linh, Trần Ngọc Văn, Phạm Ngọc Tiến (editor & adapter); Vũ Thu Phương, Đức Hải, Quang Thịnh/Huy Khánh, Đinh Thúy Hằng/Thanh Hoài, Tiết Cương, Thùy Dương, Quốc Huy, Quỳnh Thư, Châu Thế Tâm, Đinh Hằng Nga, Quốc Hùng, Kiều Trinh, Hồng Mơ, Duy Nhân, Huỳnh Anh Tuấn, Siu Black, Thanh Diệp, Trà My, Thủy Cúc, Xuân Yến, Xuân Hiệp, Huy Cường, Hải Anh, Tống Mỹ Ly...	Tình yêu thiên thần (Angelic Love); Opening version by Kasim Hoàng Vũ; Ending version by Giang Hồng Ngọc	Comedy, Romance, Drama	Based on Argentinian telenovela 'Lalola'. Reduced from 150 eps to 100 eps due to negative feedback. Changed some of cast and director after ep 29 due to internal conflict.

=== Thursday-Saturday dramas ===
Starting on 9 July 2009, VTV adds Saturday prime-time to this time slot.

These dramas air from 21h to 21h50, Thursday to Saturday on VTV3.

Broadcast	Title	Eps.	Prod.	Cast and crew	Theme song(s)	Genre	Notes
29 Aug-5 Nov	Tin vào điều không thể (Even If It's Impossible)	28	VFC and Khải Hưng Film	Vũ Hồng Sơn, Đỗ Chí Hướng (director); Vũ Thu Dung (adapter); Ngọc Oanh, Mạnh Cường, Ngọc Quỳnh, Kiều Anh, Trần Nhượng, Hoàng Xuân, Cao Nga, Huyền Thanh, Khôi Nguyên, Tuấn Dương, Phúc Khánh, Hữu Độ, Thúy An, Minh Tuấn, Thu Hương, Quang Vinh, Thái Hòa, Hồng Anh, Hồng Nhung, Minh Thư, Lê Nam...		Drama, Romance, Family	Based on Chinese drama 'Thank You For Having Loved Me' (2007)
6 Nov 2009- 7 Jan 2010	Ngôi nhà hạnh phúc (Full House)	26	BHD	Vũ Ngọc Đãng (director & writer); Lương Mạnh Hải, Minh Hằng, Lam Trường, Thủy Tiên, Hiếu Hiền, Tường Vi, Kim Ngọc, Nguyễn Văn Tùng, Ngọc Anh, Đoàn Minh Tuấn, La Quốc Hùng, Gia Đoàn... Cameo: Tăng Thanh Hà	Chàng trai tháng 12 (December Boy) & Ngôi nhà hạnh phúc (Full House) by Thủy Tiên	Romance, Comedy	Based on Korean drama of the same name (2004)

== VTV3 Saturday/Sunday Afternoon - Rubic 8 dramas ==
=== Saturday/Sunday Afternoon dramas ===
These dramas air in early afternoon, Saturday or Sunday on VTV3 as a part of the programs Cinema for Saturday Afternoon or Sunday Literature & Art. Both of these time slots had been replaced by Rubic 8 time slot since February 28.

Broadcast	Title	Eps.	Prod.	Cast and crew	Theme song(s)	Genre	Notes
4 Jan-8 Feb	Đất thiêng (Sacred Land)	6 (70′)	VFC	Triệu Tuấn (director); Đoàn Hữu Nam (writer); Trần Hạnh, Dương Đức Quang, Văn Hiệp, Xuân Tiên, Hồng Quân, Tiến Việt, Việt Thắng, Hồng Liên, Tuấn Hải, Văn Huy, Minh Ngọc, Công Lý, Huyền Thanh, Văn Thuận, Thu Huyền...	'Đất thiêng' theme song	Political, Drama, Rural	Adapted from the novel of the same name by Nguyễn Văn Cự
15 Feb	Sau cơn mưa (After the Rain)	1 (70′)	VFC	Triệu Tuấn (director); Vũ Thanh (writer); Phí Thùy Linh, Quang Lâm, Thùy Liên, Tuấn Kiên, Văn Việt, Hoàng Hiệp, Thế Hoàng Hiệp, Ngọc Dương, Vân Anh, Ngọc Anh, Đại Mý, Thái Hòa, Đức Hưng...		Romance, Family, Crime	
21 Feb	Bố con người làm đồ giả (Counterfeiters Family)	2 (70′)	VFS	Trần Chí Thành (director); Trần Hoàng Thái Ly (writer); Anh Thái, Đình Chiến, Thanh Giang, Thanh Hưng, Tuấn Dương, Công Lý, Anh Dũng, Lê Dung, Xuân Hồng, Thanh Hương, Thái Hòa, Sĩ Hùng, Thùy Trang, Kim Ly, Văn Bình, Ánh Nguyệt...	'Bố con người làm đồ giả' theme song	Drama, Family	Airs 2 eps back-to-back. The last Saturday drama
22 Feb	Trái tim đầu thai (Reincarnated Heart)	1 (90′)	VFC	Nguyễn Anh Tuấn (director); Nguyễn Yên Thế (writer); Duy Thanh, Minh Phương, Tiến Đạt, Ngọc Lê, Tiến Hội, Mạnh Hiệp, Đinh Hào, Thu Hương, Thanh Tùng, Duy Bình, Đào Thị Bình, Công Hùng...		Drama, Medical	Adapted from the short story of the same name by Nguyễn Thị Anh Thư. The last Sunday drama.

=== Rubic 8 dramas ===
New time slot was opened in 2009 as a collaboration of VFC and Galaxy Studio.

These dramas air from 14h30 to 15h15, Saturday and Sunday on VTV3 as a part of the program Rubic 8.

Broadcast	Title	Eps.	Prod.	Cast and crew	Theme song(s)	Genre	Notes
28 Feb-16 May	Người đàn bà thứ hai (The Second Woman)	23	VFC	Vũ Hồng Sơn, Đỗ Chí Hướng (directors); Quỳnh Anh Team (writers); Trúc Mai, Tiến Lộc, Kiều Anh, Đức Khuê, Ngọc Tản, Hương Dung, Trần Hạnh, Huyền Thanh, Bạch Diện, Kiên Cường, Thúy An, Minh Trang, Thu Huyền, Khôi Nguyên, Bình Xuyên, Huyền Sâm, Hồng Quang, Hoàng Nguyên, Sơn Nam...	Người đàn bà thứ hai (The Second Woman) by Ngọc Anh	Drama, Marriage	The first drama series airing on Rubic8 time slot
17 May-30 Aug	13 nữ tù (13 Women Captives)	31	VFC	Lưu Trọng Ninh (director); Đặng Thu Hà, Trần Thị Thu (writers); Phương Mai, Hồng Vân, Hoàng Hạnh, Thu Quỳnh, Minh Nguyệt, Mai Phương, Lan Hoàng, Thúy Hà, Ánh Nguyệt, Lương Giang, Đỗ Quỳnh Hoa, Huyền Trang, Mai Kat... Cameo: Thanh Lam	Phù dung (Furong) by Pha Lê Lầm lỡ (Mistakes) by Lệ Quyên	Crime, Drama	
5 Sep 2009- 10 Jan 2010	Bước nhảy xì-tin (Teenage Dance Step)	38	VFC	Vũ Trường Khoa (director); Thiều Hà Quang Nghĩa (writer); Chi Hoa, Đoàn Thanh Tùng, Minh Trí, Hoàng Dũng, Minh Châu, Thanh Quý, Minh Hòa, Trần Đức, Duy Thành, Mạnh Hùng, Đức Anh, Bảo Anh, Đức Huy, Đức Anh, Khắc Hiếu, Linh Linh, Ngọc Thanh, Sao Mai, Quỳnh Mai, Thúy Vy, Duy Hiếu, Thúy Linh, Thúy Vân, Ngọc Dung, Trần Hạnh, Diệp Bình, Minh Nguyệt, Dương Đức Quang, Cường Việt	Xao động (Sensation) by Pha Lê Biết yêu (Know Love) by Thùy Chi	Drama, Musical, Coming-of-Age	

== See also ==
- List of dramas broadcast by Vietnam Television (VTV)
- List of dramas broadcast by Hanoi Radio Television (HanoiTV)
- List of dramas broadcast by Vietnam Digital Television (VTC)
