= List of VTV dramas broadcast in 2010 =

This is a list of VTV dramas released in 2010.

←2009 - 2010 - 2011→

== VTV Tet dramas ==
=== VTV1 ===
These dramas air on VTV1 during the period of Tet.

Broadcast	Title	Eps.	Prod.	Cast and crew	Theme song(s)	Genre	Notes
5-12 Feb	Tết cháy ôsin (Tet 'out of maid')	6	FPT Media	Đặng Tất Bình, Trịnh Lê Phong (directors); Đặng Thiếu Ngân (writer); Vân Dung, Quỳnh Hoa, Công Lý, Trung Hiếu, Kim Xuyến, Diệu Hương, Quách An An, Huệ Đàn, Thanh Thủy, Tuyết Liên, Thanh Hiền, Tùng Anh, Hằng Nga, Hoàng Vi, Thu Hoài, Kim Thúy, Thu Hiền...	'Tết cháy ôsin' theme song by Cao Thái Sơn	Comedy, Family	Airs 20h10-21h, 22nd to 29th Lunar December
13-17 Feb	Thời khắc may mắn (Lucky Moment)	5	Đông A Pictures	Trần Lực (director); Hoàng Anh (writer); Tiến Đạt, Quế Hằng, Kiều Thanh, Hồng Lê, Vĩnh Xương, Phú Đôn, Đức Khuê...		Comedy, Romance, Family	Airs 10h-10h50, 30th to 4th Tet holiday
15-26 Feb	Quý cô tuổi Dần (Tiger Ladies)	10	Phước Sang Film	Lê Văn Thảo (director); Đoan Ngọc (writer); Minh Trang, Hồng Thy, Minh Thư, Thu Thủy, Lý Hùng, Quang Thắng, Tấn Bo, Duy Phương, Anh Tài, Vũ Long, Mỹ Chi...	Em vẫn luôn cần anh (I Always Need You) by Thu Thủy; Quý cô tuổi Dần (Tiger Lady) by Anh Tài	Comedy, Romance	Airs 20h-20h50, 2nd to 13th Lunar January
18 Feb	Giao thừa đón lộc vàng (Fortune Comes With New Year's Eve)	1	VFC	Nguyễn Danh Dũng (director); Lê Công Hội (writer); Chí Trung, Tiến Đạt, Hồ Liên, Thanh Tú, Thành Trung, Văn Toản, Phùng Khánh Linh, Vân Anh, Chiến Thắng, Hải Anh, Hải Yến...		Comedy	Airs 9h45-10h45, 5th Tet holiday

=== VTV3 ===
These dramas air on VTV3 during the period of Tet.

Broadcast	Title	Eps.	Prod.	Cast and crew	Theme song(s)	Genre	Notes
13 Feb	Căn bệnh kỳ lạ (The Odd Disease)	1	VFC	Đỗ Chí Hướng (director); Đoàn Trúc Quỳnh (writer); Văn Hiệp, Kim Xuyến, Hồng Quang, Thu Hương, Hồng Chương, Ngọc Anh, Thanh Hoa, Thái Hòa...		Comedy, Family	Airs 9h30-10h45, 30th Tet holiday
14 Feb	Lẵng hoa Tết (Tet Flower Basket)	1	VFC	Đỗ Chí Hướng (director); Nguyễn Quang Thiều, Lê Trung Thủy (writers); Hữu Độ, Ngọc Tản, Việt Nga, Lê Hoàng, Thúy Hạnh, Trọng Hùng, Vân Anh, Thah Huyền...		Family, Drama	Airs 17h30-18h40, 1st Tet holiday
15 Feb	Ôsin sành điệu (Fancy Maid)	1	VFC	Đỗ Gia Chung (director); Nguyễn Ngân Hà (writer); Thanh Dương, Nguyệt Hằng, Huyền Trang, Mai Chi, Lê Mai...		Comedy, Family	Airs 14h-15h10, 2nd Tet holiday
16 Feb	Xuân Cồ bịt trống (Xuân Cồ Story: Another Child)	1	VFC	Vũ Minh Trí (director); Khuất Quang Thụy (writer); Trung Hiếu, Công Lý, Thanh Tú, Ngọc Dung, Chiến Thắng, Phạm Cường, Thùy Liên, Mạnh Hiệp, Minh Tuấn, Hồng Sơn, Đăng Minh, Tiến Lợi, Thục Anh...	Xuân lứa đôi (Spring for Couples) by Hồng Nhung & Tiến Minh	Comedy, Rural, Political	Airs 9h30-10h45, 3rd Tet holiday
16-18 Feb	Cưới ngay kẻo Tết/Môn đăng hộ đối (Hurry to Marry)	3	VTV and TVPlus	Phi Tiến Sơn, Nguyễn Hữu Trọng (directors); Thu Trang (writer); Hồng Vân, Thanh Hoàng, Huyền Trâm, Trung Dũng, Cao Dũng, Hiếu Hiền, Nguyễn Hậu, Lê Kiều Như, Phương Trinh...	Sẽ đi tới chân trời (Will go to the Horizon) by Thu Hường & Khắc Hiếu	Romance, Comedy, Family	Airs 21h-21h50, 3rd-5th Tet holiday

== VTV1 Weeknight Prime-time dramas ==
=== Monday-Wednesday dramas ===
These dramas air from 20h10 to 21h, Monday to Wednesday on VTV1.

Broadcast	Title	Eps.	Prod.	Cast and crew	Theme song(s)	Genre	Notes
8 Mar-15 Jun	Ám ảnh xanh (Green Obsession)	38	VFS, Southern Golden Film and Nghiệp Thắng LTD	Châu Huế, Vũ Đình Thân (directors); Chu Lai, Anh Thúy (writers); Thu Hương, Quốc Anh, Kiến An, Thái Bảo, Tuấn Khang, Thu Hằng, Mẫn Đức Kiên, Thanh Tùng, Lê Tuấn, Lê Hồng Sơn, Hồ Văn Minh, Thành Bỉ, Ngọc Thơ, Hoàng Long, Lân Bích, Minh Đáng, Quách Tĩnh, Quỳnh Như, Thái Nghiêm Tùng...	Tình người như dòng sông (River of Humanity) by Thái Bảo	Political, Drama	Based on the novel of 'Chỉ còn một lần' by Chu Lai. Remake of Ba lần và một lần (2002).
16 Jun-22 Sep	Cảnh sát Hình sự:Cuồng phong (Criminal Police:The Storm)	41	Lasta Film and VFS	Bùi Huy Thuần (director); Khương Hồng Minh, Quách Thùy Nhung, Lê Anh Thúy, Tống Phương Dung (writers); Hoàng Dũng, Minh Hòa, Trung Hiếu, Tạ Minh Thảo, Thu Hương, Kiều Thanh, Diệu Hương, Hoa Thúy, Xuân Trường, Tiến Đạt, Minh Thư, Thanh Lâm, Đỗ Kỷ, Vĩnh Xương, Bình Xuyên, Ngọc Trung, Quốc Khánh, Bảo Anh, Phú Thăng, Tạ Am, Hồ Phong, Sỹ Hoài...	Cuồng phong (The Storm) by Văn Tứ Quý	Crime, Drama	First non-VFC Cảnh sát hình sự drama
27 Sep 2010- 19 Jan 2011	Bí thư tỉnh uỷ (Provincial Party Secretary)	50	VFC	Trần Quốc Trọng, Trần Trọng Khôi (directors); Vân Thảo (writer); Dũng Nhi, Minh Châu, Mai Hoa, Lan Hương 'Bông', Đức Trung, Mậu Hòa, Văn Bộ, Kim Phụng, Trần Quốc Trọng, Bình Xuyên, Trịnh Nhật, Hồng Quang, Bạch Diện, Văn Minh, Tiến Bình, Danh Thái, Nguyễn Thị Vân, Bích Thủy, Văn Dương, Hoàng Huy, Thu Bảy, Mạnh Quyền, Khôi Nguyên, Thanh Thủy, Hoàng San, Xuân Kiểm, Hữu Dũng, Văn Duyệt, Đức Hoàn, Thanh Hiền, Kim Tuyến, Văn Triệu...	Quê hương ơi (My Dear Homeland) by Mai Hoa 'Bí thư tỉnh ủy' ending song by Trọng Tấn	Political, Drama, Biography	Adapted from the novel of the same name by Vân Thảo based on a true story

=== Thursday-Friday dramas ===
These dramas air from 20h10 to 21h, Thursday and Friday on VTV1.

Broadcast	Title	Eps.	Prod.	Cast and crew	Theme song(s)	Genre	Notes
13 May-25 Jun	Món nợ miền Đông (Eastern Uprising)	13	VFC	Trần Vịnh (director); Nguyễn Trung Hiếu, Trung Trung Đỉnh, Trần Thanh Phong (writers); Minh Hòa, Bá Thi, Miên Viễn, Cẩm Nhung, Hồng Chương, Như Nguyệt, Sơn Tây, Thanh Tùng, Hiếu Thành, Thành An, Ngọc Nga, Long Vân, Thu Trang, Trần Vượng, Như Ngọc, Ngọc Quế, Thanh Hải, Hoàng Thanh, Mai Hường, Thanh Liêm, Xuân Thảo, Bá Hùng, Ngọc Thức, Đặng Tuấn, Ngọc Anh, Thanh Phong, Duy Khang, Tiên, Minh Ngân, Bình Minh...	'Món nợ miền Đông' theme song by Thu Huyền	Period, Drama, War	Originally comprises 2 part (30 eps) but part 2 never got produced
1 Jul-10 Sep	Followed by the playback of Dòng sông định mệnh (Fated River). The drama was first released on HTV9 channel in 2008-2009.						
16 Sep 2010- 17 Mar 2011	Nếp nhà (Family Through Times)	43	VFC	Vũ Trường Khoa (director); Trần Thùy Linh, Nguyễn Mạnh Cường, Hà Thủy Nguyên (writers); Lan Hương 'Bông', Đỗ Kỷ, Ngọc Lan, Hữu Độ, Minh Châu, Trung Anh, Kiều Minh Hiếu, Hoàng Lan, Lê Mai, Thanh Sơn, Hà Anh, Hoài Anh, Mai Ngọc Căn, Đắc Cường, Phạm Minh Nguyệt, Thúy An, Phú Thăng, Ngọc Hà, Vy Hương, Minh Nguyệt, Trung Kon, Hồng Nhung, Tùng Anh, Dương Đức Quang, Ngọc Tản, Mý Thủy, Danh Thái, Thùy Liên, Quốc Hùng, Đức Lâm, Minh Lý, Quang Lâm, Uy Linh, Đăng Văn, Ngọc Long, Mạnh Linh... Cameo: Nguyễn Vinh Phúc, Đào Anh Khánh, Hoàng Kỷ, Bạch Vân...	Yêu thương trở lại (Lovings Return) by Tấn Minh Tiền lá (Leaf Cash) by Thùy Chi	Family, Drama	Produced in order to celebrate 1000 Years of Thăng Long - Hà Nội. Delayed several times due to Tet and events. Ep 32 to 40 air Mon-Fri (22 Feb-4 Mar 2011)

== VTV3 Weeknight Prime-time dramas ==
=== Monday-Wednesday dramas ===
These dramas air from 21h10 to 22h, Monday to Wednesday on VTV3.

Broadcast	Title	Eps.	Prod.	Cast and crew	Theme song(s)	Genre	Notes
2 Mar-1 Jun	Những thiên thần áo trắng (Angels in White)	40	BHD	Lê Hoàng (director & writer); Miu Lê, Thanh Hải, Đỗ Tùng Lâm, Nam Cường, Nhã Phương, Mai Phương, Midu, Lan Phương, Mỹ Duyên, Phi Thanh Vân, Dương Hoàng Anh, Trương Minh Cường, Thanh Hoàng, Ánh Nhật...	Thiên thần áo trắng (Angels in White); Bạn ơi hãy nhớ (Remember, My Friend!); Và ta yêu (And We Fall In Love) by Minh Thư	Romance, Scholastic, Coming-of-Age	
2-28 Jun	Cảnh sát hình sự: Mặt nạ hoàn hảo (Criminal Police: The Perfect Mask)	11	VFC	Nguyễn Tiến Dũng (director); Trần Thục Uyên, Nguyễn Trung Dũng (writers); Hồng Đăng, Bảo Anh, Tiến Ngọc, Huệ Đàn, Viết Liên, Vũ Phan Anh, Đức Thuận, Trung Hiếu, Chu Hùng, Duy Thanh, Trần Đức, Minh Hằng, Trúc Mai, Thanh Hương, Huyền Baby, Nhung Kate...	Đến nơi bình yên (To a Quiet Place) by Lưu Hương Giang; Những bàn chân lặng lẽ (Quiet Steps) by Thùy Dung	Crime, Thriller, Drama	
29 Jun-15 Sep	Vệt nắng cuối trời (Last Ray of the Sun)	38	Lasta Film	Trần Hoài Sơn (director); Hà Thu Hà, Đinh Thị Thủy, Nguyễn Thị Thanh Thủy (writers); Tuấn Quang, Nguyệt Hằng, Lan Hương 'Bông', Anh Dũng, Trung Hiếu, Minh Hương, Hoàng Hải, Đỗ Quỳnh Hoa, Trần Hạnh, Hoàng Huy, Nguyễn Thu Hà, Kiều Thanh, Mạnh Quân, Xuân Thịnh, Tạ Am, Nguyễn Thị Hạnh...	Vệt nắng cuối trời (Last Ray of the Sun) by Tiến Minh	Drama, Marriage, Romance	Ep 30 airs on Fri, 3 Sep. Ep 31 to 35 air on Mon to Fri, 6-10 Sep
16 Sep-13 Dec	Phía cuối cầu vồng (At the End of the Rainbow)	43	VTV and Trần Gia Studio	Mai Hồng Phong (director); Hoàng Nhung, Ngô Phương Hạnh (writers); Dương Hoàng Anh, Tiến Đoàn, Bích Huyền, Lục Diệp, Dương Thùy Linh, Hồ Liên, Trang Dung, Minh Hà, Hữu Phương, Cường Irac, Tạ Minh Thảo, Hà Văn Trọng, Hồng Hải, Diệp Bích, Văn Huy, Thanh Vân Hugo...	Phía cuối cầu vồng (At the End of the Rainbow) by Dương Hoàng Yến; Mình mãi bên nhau (Together Forever) by Mỹ Dung; Ngày hôm qua (Yesterday) by Hoài Nam	Drama, Romance, Business	Adapted from the story of 'Công ty' (Company) by Phan Hồn Nhiên. First 12 eps air on Mon to Fri (16 Sep - 1 Oct)
14 Dec 2010- 7 Mar 2011	Cuộc gọi lúc 0 giờ (The Call at Zero O'clock)	35	Khang Viet Film & Thăng Long Media	Nguyễn Danh Dũng (director); Vũ Thị Thanh Hương, Trần Thị Thục Uyên (writers); Đinh Thơ, Diễm My, Minh Tiệp, Ngọc Lan, Thế Tâm, Lê Bê La, Tấn Bo, Kiều Linh, Đình Hiếu, Cát Tường, Công Ninh...	Tình yêu là thế (That's Love) & Tình ông (What a Grandpa Does) by Vũ Quốc Việt	Drama, Mystery, Business	

=== Thursday-Saturday dramas ===
These dramas air from 21h10 to 22h, Thursday to Saturday on VTV3.

- Note: After Chít và Pi, no more dramas aired on Saturday. The time slot was followed by several episodes of Vệt nắng cuối trời & Phía cuối cầu vồng (originally air on Monday to Wednesday time slot), then new drama Cho một tình yêu.

Broadcast	Title	Eps.	Prod.	Cast and crew	Theme song(s)	Genre	Notes
8 Jan-25 Jun	Bí mật Eva (Eva's Secrets)	70	Galaxy Studio	Đỗ Minh Tuấn (director); Ngô Phương Hạnh (writer); Thúy Hằng, Thúy Hà, Thu Hạnh, Nguyệt Hằng, Bá Anh, Trịnh Mai Nguyên, Vũ Phan Anh, Phan Ngọc Lan, Thu Hà, Phùng Huy Thịnh, Tùng Linh, Phương Thảo, Mỹ Anh, Anh Quân, Linh Nga, Ngọc Hà, Bảo Nam, Trang Nhung, Diệu Yến, Hằng Vy, Anh Đức, Quốc Hùng, Thùy Dung, Thanh Dương, Doãn Tuấn, Quốc Thắng, Thu Hường, Thúy Liên, Diệp Bích...	'Bí mật Eva' theme song by Nguyễn Ngọc Anh	Drama, Slice-of-Life, Romance	
26 Jun-2 Sep	Chít và Pi (Chít and Pi)	26	FPT Media and Vimax Film	Ngô Quang Hải (executive director); Nguyễn Hoàng Điệp (director); Quốc Đạt, Phương Thảo, Việt Trung (writers); Phan Đăng Di (editor); Vũ Ngọc Phượng (casting); Hạ Hồng Vân, Phạm Thanh Hòa, Tăng Nhật Tuệ, Huỳnh Minh Thủy, Bùi Hương Giang, Kiên Hoàng, Bùi Thùy Linh, Nguyễn Quang Minh, Đăng Nguyên, Quách Thu Phương, Vũ Phan Anh, Hoàng Việt Nga, Văn Toản, Lưu Đê Ly, Diệu Thuần, Thu An, Doãn Tuấn, Vân Anh, Hồng Nhung, Đắc Cường, Phạm Bảo Long, Tạ Hải Bảo Vương, Trương Kim Ngân...	Ánh sáng và bầu trời (Light and Sky); Alt. Rock version by Tóc Tiên; Hip Hop version by Tăng Nhật Tuệ & Double D Như bình minh bắt đầu (Like the Sun is Rising) by Thùy Chi	Coming-of-Age, Scholastic, Romance	Adapted from the diary of 'Đầu đỏ và các bạn' (Red Head & Friends). Produced in 2008. Delayed 3 eps on 3rd Jul, 31st Jul & 21st Aug.
7 Oct 2010- 10 Feb 2011	Cho một tình yêu (For a Love)	37	BHD	Nguyễn Tranh, Lê Hóa (directors); Phạm Nhị Trần (writer); Mỹ Tâm, Tuấn Hưng, Quang Dũng, Hiếu Hiền, Thanh Nguyệt, Nguyễn Văn Phúc, Minh Thuận, Leon Quang Lê, Tiến Đạt, Minh Khuê, Minh Tú, Lê Phương, Đoàn Minh Tuấn, Lê Hoàng, Lê Phương, Hồ Thái Huy, Văn Tùng, Phương Giao, Yến Nhi, Trần Anh Dũng, Hồng Ngọc, Hoài Thương, Thanh Bình, Huỳnh Văn Đua, Đỗ Hương, Phong Việt...	Cho một tình yêu (For a Love) & Không yêu! Không yêu! (Not Love! Not Love!) by Mỹ Tâm	Romance, Musical, Drama	

== VTV3 Rubic 8 dramas ==
These dramas air from 14h30 to 15h15, Saturday and Sunday on VTV3 as a part of the program Rubic 8.

Broadcast	Title	Eps.	Prod.	Cast and crew	Theme song(s)	Genre	Notes
16 Jan-28 Mar	Bà nội không ăn pizza (Grandma Doesn't Eat Pizza)	22	VFC and Galaxy Studio	Nguyễn Khải Anh, Bùi Tiến Huy (directors); Nguyễn Mỹ Trang, Đoàn Mai Hoa, Hà Anh Thu, Ngô Phương Hạnh, Trịnh Đan Phượng, Trần Thị Thu (writers); Danh Tùng, Nhung Kate, Thanh Tú, Lê Mai, Anh Thơ, Trang Pháp, Diễm Hằng, Tiến Ngọc, Huệ Đàn, Hải Yến, Trí Tuệ, Trần Hạnh, Thùy Liên, Mai Ngọc Căn, Khánh Toàn, Hồng Quang, Thanh Tùng, Mạnh Hùng...	Sống đẹp (Beautiful Life) by Khắc Hiếu Điều em muốn nói (What I Wanna Say) by Huỳnh Minh Thủy	Comedy, Romance, Drama	
3 Apr-11 Jul	Blog nàng dâu (Bride's Blog)	30	VFC	Mai Hồng Phong (director); Nguyễn Mạnh Cường, Hà Thủy Nguyên (writers); Lã Thanh Huyền, Tuấn Tú, Như Quỳnh, Hải Anh, Trần Thụ, Diễm Hằng, Đỗ Quỳnh Hoa, Thanh Hoa, Tạ Am, Trọng Bình, Hồng Đức, Huyền Thanh, Hùng Nhãn, Lệ Mỹ, Trần Lực, Huy Cường, Việt Thường, Việt Bình, Thanh Hiền, Thanh Loan, Blach Lộc, Quang Minh, Xuân Bình, Xuân Đại, Hương Giang, Uy Linh, Băng Tình...	Giấc mơ hạnh phúc (Dream of Happiness) by Lã Thanh Huyền Không thể cách xa (Can't Be Apart) by Lã Thanh Huyền & Tuấn Tú	Family, Drama, Romance	
17-18 Jul	Nhật ký viết đến ngày 8-3 (The Diary Written 'Til March 8)	2	VFC	Phạm Gia Phương (director); Phạm Thanh Phong (writer); Trọng Khôi, Minh Phương, Nhung Kate, Thiện Tùng, Khánh Huyền, Đào Hoàng Yến, Văn Hảo, Lệ Mỹ, Đại Mý...		Drama, Family	
24-25 Jul	Tươi - Tắn (Tuoi & Tan Story)	2	TPD Center	Bùi Thạc Chuyên (director); Bùi Kim Quy (writer); Tú Oanh, Thanh Bình, Hoàng Khánh Song Biên, Vũ Anh Duy...		Comedy	
31 Jul-8 Aug	Người tình bí ẩn (Secret Lover)	4	Galaxy Studio	Trần Toàn (director); Ngọc Thuận, Anh Đào, Kim Phương, Phùng Ngọc Huy, Hồng Thy, Trịnh Phương Đài, Hồng Tơ, Bảo Minh...	Mong muốn đã muộn màng (Belated Wish) by Uyên Trang	Drama	Based on true story from the article 'Truy lùng người tình bí ẩn' by Minh Khánh
14-29 Aug	Nốt nhạc con gái (Girls' Note)	6	VFC and Galaxy Studio	Bùi Quốc Việt (director); Anh Dũng (writer); Bảo Thanh, Đinh Thúy Hà, Nguyễn Hồng Nhung, Bảo Anh, Dương Ngọc Hân, Nguyễn Thanh Tùng...	'Nốt nhạc con gái' opening song 'Nốt nhạc con gái' ending song Music by Tăng Nhật Tuệ	Drama, Musical	
4-12 Sep	Bảo mẫu bất đắc dĩ (Unavoidable Babysitter)	4	Galaxy Studio	Trần Trung Dũng (director); Trần Hoàng Thái Ly, Trần Thị Thu (writer); Lưu Đê Ly, Thanh Hương, Nguyễn Hoàng Nam, Thùy Dương...		Comedy, Romance	
18 Sep 2010- 2 Jan 2011	A2Z: Dịch vụ gỡ rối từ A đến Z (A2Z: Solving Service)	32	VFC and Galaxy Studio	Trần Chí Thành, Nguyễn Anh Tuấn (director); Trần Anh Hoa Team (writers); Nguyễn Thu Thủy, Văn Anh, Ngô Hồng Thái, Đồng Thanh Bình, Như Quỳnh, Thủy Ngân, Ngọc Quỳnh, Phát Triệu, Kim Xuyến, Nguyễn Hồng Loan, Vũ Thị Chanh, Trần Đức, Hoài Nam, Ngọc Minh, Minh Hoàng, Hải Điệp, Thanh Hiền, Ngọc Duy, Tuấn Dương, An Ninh, Thế Bình, Phú Thăng, Thiên Kiều, Thiện Tùng, Văn Học...	'A2Z: Dịch vụ gỡ rối từ A đến Z' opening song 'A2Z: Dịch vụ gỡ rối từ A đến Z' ending song by Thanh Thủy, Anh Tú, Lam Trang	Comedy, Drama	

== See also ==
- List of dramas broadcast by Vietnam Television (VTV)
- List of dramas broadcast by Hanoi Radio Television (HanoiTV)
- List of dramas broadcast by Vietnam Digital Television (VTC)
