= List of VTV dramas broadcast in 2007 =

This is a list of VTV dramas released in 2007.

←2006 - 2007 - 2008→

== VTV Tet dramas ==
These short dramas air on VTV channels during Tet holiday.

=== VTV1 ===
Broadcast	Title	Eps.	Prod.	Cast and crew	Theme song(s)	Genre	Notes
16 Feb	Biên kịch nghiệp dư (Amateur Scriptwriter)	1 (70′)	VFC	Bùi Huy Thuần (director); Lương Xuân Thủy (writer); Đức Khuê, Minh Vượng, Văn Hiệp, Phùng Khánh Linh, Thành Trung, Huyền Thanh, Thanh Tùng, Hải Anh, Cường Việt, Trà My, Lương Giang, Phương Khanh, Kim Thanh, Tuấn Cường...		Drama	Airs 09:30, 29th Tet holiday
17-18 Feb	Khách đến chơi xuân (New Year Visitor)	2 (70′)	Vietnam Cinema Department & VTC	Nguyễn Mạnh Hà (director); Đỗ Hùng Quang (writer); Tiến Mộc, Thùy Liên, Trần Hạnh, Anh Quân, Hà Duy, Linh Chi, Hoàng Mai, Phương Khanh, Xuân Hậu, Xuân Dương...	Theme For Malcolm by Donald Byrd	Drama, Family	Airs 09:30, 1st & 2nd Tet holiday
18 Feb	Thầy cúng làng (Rural Shaman)	1 (85′)	VFC	Triệu Tuấn (director); Nguyễn Long Khánh (writer); Bình Trọng, Tuấn Dương, Thùy Liên, Vân Anh, Đức Hải, Phương Lâm, Kiên Cường, Quốc Quân, Tiến Lâm, Nguyễn Hậu, Văn Việt, Hải Anh, Kim Xuyến, Lý Công, Kiểu Loan, Mỹ Duyên, Duy Phong, Thanh Mai, Việt Tuấn...		Rural, Comedy	Airs 21:00, 2nd Tet holiday. Adapted from short story of 'Phiên bản' by Vũ Quốc Văn.
19 Feb	Những kẻ háo ngọt (Sweet! Sweet! Sweet!)	1 (70′)	VFC	Vũ Hồng Sơn (director); Phạm Ngọc Tiến (writer); Đình Chiến, Hồng Sơn, Hoàng Dũng, Lan Hương 'Bông', Bùi Bài Bình, Quang Lâm, Tuấn Dương, Phú Đôn, Thùy Liên, Thúy Kiều, Minh Châu, Thu Hà, Bích Ngọc, Hương Lê, Hải Anh...		Comedy	Airs 09:30, 3rd Tet holiday
20 Feb	Đáo Xuân (Coming to Spring)	1 (70′)	VFC	Trọng Trinh (director); Đặng Huy Quyền (writer); Quốc Trị, Văn Hiệp, Hồng Sơn, Thùy Liên, Phương Loan, Tiến Lộc, Phùng Khánh Linh, Huy Quyền, Xuân Mạnh, Đình Văn, Văn Mĩ...		Comedy, Rural	Airs 09:30, 4th Tet holiday

=== VTV3 ===
Broadcast	Title	Eps.	Prod.	Cast and crew	Theme song(s)	Genre	Notes
17 Feb	Vai phụ (The Supporting Role)	1 (85′)	VFC	Lê Cường Việt (director); Tiểu Cầm (writer); Cường Việt, Quỳnh Tứ, Huy Trinh, Quốc Trị, Phương Khanh, Hồng Sơn, Thu Hà, Đức Thắng, Quốc Quân, Hoàng Lâm, Hải Anh, Hương Anh, Minh Hoàng, Vũ Huy, Hương Giang, Trần Hùng, Quý Hà, Bích Vân, Tạ Am, Hưng Nhãn, Minh Tú, Hoàng Chiến, Mạnh Linh, Phát Lộc, Đăng Văn, Đắc Huy...		Romance, Drama	Airs 17:30, 1st Tet holiday. Originally intended for the 2006 Tet holiday.
17 Feb	Công nghệ giữ chồng (Husband Management Technology)	1	VFC	Trung Hiếu, Minh Hằng...		Comedy, Marriage	Airs 22:00, 1st Tet holiday

== VTV1 Weeknight Prime-time dramas ==
Starting on 20 September 2007, VTV launched the first prime time slot for Vietnamese dramas.

These dramas air from 21:10 to 22:00, Monday to Friday on VTV1.

- Note: Cỏ lông chông airs in prime time but not officially prime time slot for only Vietnamese dramas. The drama was followed by Korean period drama Jumong from 7 March to 19 September.

Broadcast	Title	Eps.	Prod.	Cast and crew	Theme song(s)	Genre	Notes
22 Jan-6 Mar	Cỏ lông chông (Spike Grass)	22	VFC	Bùi Huy Thuần (director); Đình Kính (writer); Thanh Hoa, Hoàng Hải, Trung Anh, Lan Hương 'Bông', Tiến Minh, Thanh Giang, Công Lý, Phú Thăng, Hồng Sơn, Minh Nguyệt, Trần Đức...		Drama, Romance	Adapted from the novel of the same name by Đình Kính
Officially launched the prime time slot for only Vietnamese dramas
20 Sep-5 Oct	Cảnh sát hình sự: Đột kích (Criminal Police: Assault)	12	VFC	Vũ Minh Trí (director); Trần Hoài Văn (writer); Kiều Thanh, Trọng Trinh, Thanh Tùng, Tạ Minh Thảo, Vũ Phan Anh, Thanh Hiền, Tạ Am, Bùi Đăng Văn, Tiến Minh, Quốc Quân, Lê Quốc Thắng...	Những bàn chân lặng lẽ (Quiet Steps) by Thùy Dung	Crime, Drama	Launching prime time slot for Vietnamese dramas
8 Oct-1 Nov	Ma làng (Ghosts of the Village)	19	VFC	Nguyễn Hữu Phần, Hoàng Lâm (directors); Nguyễn Hữu Phần, Phạm Ngọc Tiến (writers); Bùi Bài Bình, Hồng Sơn, Ngô Thị Ngân, Minh Lộc, Kim Oanh, Lý Thanh Kha, Dịu Hương, Trần Tuấn, Anh Tuấn, Bạch Diện, Phùng Cường, Yến Hoa, Quang Lâm, Tùng Anh, Phương Anh, Thu Trang, Quang Huy, Ngọc Hoa, Nguyễn Hậu, Thanh Nhàn, Minh Phương...	Đêm cuối cùng của mùa đông (The Last Night Of Winter) by Minh Chuyên	Rural, Drama, Period	Adapted from the novel of the same name by Trịnh Thanh Phong
2 Nov-10 Dec	Luật đời (Rules of Life)	25	VFC	Mai Hồng Phong, Hoàng Nhung (directors); Đặng Diệu Hương, Trần Phương Lan (writers); Hà Văn Trọng, Quốc Tuấn, Thanh Quý, Mạnh Cường, Anh Dũng, Hoàng Mai, Thúy Hà, Diệu Hương, Mẫn Đức Kiên, Hữu Độ, Phát Triệu, Đức Trung, Khôi Nguyên, Tạ Minh Thảo, Xuân Hảo, Anh Tuấn, Phú Kiên, Cát Trần Tùng, Kiều Anh, Minh Quốc, Trần Thụ, Văn Thắng, Hải Yến, Hồng Thêu, Hương Giang...	Ru đời (Lullaby for Life) by Việt Hoàn	Political, Drama, Family	Adapted from the novel of 'Luật đời và cha con' by Nguyễn Bắc Sơn
11-25 Dec	Cổng trường thời mở cửa (School Gate: Renovated Era)	10	VFC	Triệu Tuấn (director); Nguyễn Hữu Đạt (writer); Hoàng Mai, Thu Hương, Diệu Hương, Xuân Tiên, Thu Thủy, Văn Toản, Ngọc Tản, Thu Hiền, Trần Nhượng, Đình Chiến, Đức Thiện, Trần Hạnh, Hoàng Dung, Nam Cương, Khả Sinh...	'Cổng trường thời mở cửa' theme song by Phương Mai	Drama, Scholastic, Political	
27 Dec 2007- 18 Jan 2008	Cảnh sát hình sự: Kẻ giấu mặt (Criminal Police: Hidden Man)	16	VFC	Vũ Hồng Sơn, Đỗ Đức Thành (directors); Trần Hoài Văn (writer); Phạm Hồng Minh, Quốc Khánh, Bình Xuyên, Hoa Thúy, Vũ Phan Anh, Minh Tuấn, Hoàng Mai, Vũ Hồng Anh, Thúy Ngà, Mỹ Linh, Mai Hòa, Thu Hương, Duy Thanh, Hồng Quang...	Những bàn chân lặng lẽ (Quiet Steps) by Thùy Dung	Crime, Drama, Thriller	Adapted from the novel of 'Kẻ sát nhân không bao giờ bị bắt' by Nguyễn Thanh Hoàng

== VTV3 Cinema For Saturday Afternoon dramas ==
These dramas air in early Saturday afternoon on VTV3 with the duration approximately 70 minutes as a part of the program Cinema for Saturday afternoon (Vietnamese: Điện ảnh chiều thứ Bảy).

Broadcast	Title	Eps.	Prod.	Cast and crew	Theme song(s)	Genre	Notes
6-27 Jan	Trái tim người lính (Soldier's Heart)	4		Trần Phương (director); Nguyễn Hữu Cần (writer); Quang Ánh, Hoàng Mai, Hồng Quang, Ngọc Vân, Hán Tú, Duy Phong, Duy Thanh, Bích Huyền...	'Trái tim người lính' theme song	Drama, War	
3 Feb	Hoa ngải cứu (Mugwort Flower)	2	VFC	Phạm Hoàng Hà (director); Nguyễn Thị Khánh Ly (writer); Doãn Hoàng Kiên, Kim Thúy, Anh Dũng, Phú Thăng, Thu Huyền...	Bỏ lại tình yêu (Leave the Love Behind) by Anh Tú	Drama, Medical	
10 Feb	Đợi đến ngày Tết (Waiting For Tết)	2	Hodafilm	Phạm Nhuệ Giang (director); Hà Anh Thu (writer); Thanh Mai, Minh Phương, Quốc Trị, Quang Ánh, Hương Giang, Đặng Thị Tản, Phan Quân, Thanh Thủy, Hùng Nhãn, Văn Thước, Minh Tuấn, Tiến Ngọc...		Romance, Drama	Airs as a part of Tet dramas series
17 Feb-7 Jul	Đời người và những chuyến đi (Lifetime and Journeys)	21	Feature Film Studio I	Nguyễn Hữu Trọng, Trịnh Lê Phong (directors); Lê Ngọc Minh, Đoàn Trúc Quỳnh (writers); Bùi Bài Bình, Hồng Sơn, Lan Hương 'Bông', Trần Mạnh, Minh Phương, Hoàng Công, Quỳnh Tứ, Trần Hạnh, Quốc Quân...		Drama, Political	
14-21 Jul	Ở trọ trần gian (In the Earthly Inn)	2		Vũ Duy Kiên (director); Đoàn Mai Hoa (writer); Đức Khuê, Hoàng Xuân, Phan Quân, Hương Giang, Hồng Minh, Phương Dung, Quốc Quân, Tuấn Hùng, Vân Anh, Diệu Thuần, Trần Thụ, Hồng Vân, Thanh Loan...	'Ở trọ trần gian' theme song	Drama, Family	
28 Jul	Ngọn đèn bốn mặt (Four-sided Lamp)	1	Giải Phóng Film	Lê Hữu Lương (director); Quách Nhị (writer); Hữu Thành, Ngọc Thảo, Mai Mai, Tăng Bảo Quyên, Trí Cường, Nguyễn Hoàng, Cao Thanh Danh, Võ Thiên Lý, Trần Ngọc Hùng, Hoàng Thống, Kim Phụng, Quốc Thắng, Thái Công Trình, Trần Minh Quốc, Thương Tín, Thanh Bình, Thanh Nhàn, Ngọc Quân, Tường Vy, Thành Thuận...		Drama	Adapted from short story of 'Người giữ cồn' by Nguyễn Thế Hùng
4-11 Aug	Hoãn ăn hỏi (An Engagement Delay)	2		Hà Lê Sơn (director); Lâm Mạnh Hiệp (writer); Trần Anh Dũng, Đàm Hằng, Hoàng Yến, Mạnh Hiệp, Thanh Hiền, Diệu Thuần, Minh Phương, Quang Chính...		Romance, Drama	
18 Aug-1 Sep	Mặt trời trong thung lũng (Sun in the Valley)	3		Hà Lê Sơn (director); Hồ Lan, Bùi Kim Quy, Tống Phương Dung (writers); Hà Thị Vân, Khuất Quỳnh Hoa, Đồng Thanh Bình, Lê Tiến Việt, Võ Sỹ Đàn, Hà Thị Quyên, Nguyễn Như Đạo, Hà Thị Bình...		Drama, Ethnic	
8-15 Sep	Hai lần được sống (Two Times to Live)	2		Phạm Hoàng Hà (director); Lê Thu Thủy (writer); Mỹ Hạnh, Quang Tú, Diệp Bích, Kim Thanh, Thu Hà, Mậu Hoà...		Drama	
22-29 Sep	Vị giáo sư tinh tướng (Arrogant Professor)	2		Hùng Sơn, Đăng Khoa (directors)		Drama, Political	
6-13 Oct	Giọt nước mắt thiêng (The Sacred Tear)	2		Đoàn Lê (director & writer); Mỹ Linh, Việt Vinh, Xuân Thảo, Thu Trâm, Tiến Ba, Mạnh Tú, Duyên Kính, Văn Quyến, Phương Mai, Nguyễn Đại...	Giọt nước mắt thiêng (The Sacred Tear); Composed by Vũ Thảo	Drama, Rural, Slice-of-Life	
20-27 Oct	Người mang nợ (Debt Bearer)	2		Việt Sơn (director); Trần Nguyên, Đoàn Trúc Quỳnh (writers); Quốc Trị, Xuân Trường, Thanh Giang, Vân Anh, Mạnh Cường, Phương Nam, Ngọc Hà, Tào Khánh Chi...		Drama	
3 Nov 2007- 27 Jan 2008	Đời cần có nhau (Need You in My Life)	12		Yên Sơn (director); Đông Nguyên, Yên Sơn (writers); Thân Thúy Hà, Nguyễn Hoàng, Công Hậu, Phúc An, Xuân Thùy, Trần Gia Linh, Xuân Đào, Trương Tuấn, Lê Phương, Trần Ngọc Phong, Điền Tử Lang, Duy Thanh, Thanh Sâm, Phi Điểu, Thùy Liên, Lê Bình, Đại Lâm, Nguyễn Sanh, Lý Tiểu Bình, Phương Dung, Quỳnh Anh, Minh Phương, Hồng Phú Vinh, Tú Trâm, Dũng Thanh, Mỹ Hằng, Đinh Yến, Trương Long, Trấn Thành, Thanh Diệp, Phi Nga, Mai Dũng, Nguyệt Minh, Lê Bê La...	Hạnh phúc tìm lại (Happiness is Back) by Quang Vinh	Drama, Romance	

== VTV3 Sunday Literature & Art dramas ==
These dramas air in early Sunday afternoon on VTV3 as a part of the program Sunday Literature & Art (Vietnamese: Văn nghệ Chủ Nhật).

Broadcast	Title	Eps.	Prod.	Cast and crew	Theme song(s)	Genre	Notes
4 Feb-1 Apr	Bản lĩnh (Bravery)	8	VFC	Nguyễn Anh Tuấn (director); Nguyễn Anh Tuấn, Đặng Huy Quyển, Nguyễn Minh Tuấn (writers); Phú Thăng, Ngọc Bích, Chu Hùng, Minh Tuấn, Thanh Hằng, Tuyết Liên, Thành An, Tiến Đạt, Trần Thụ, Mai Nguyên, Tạ Am, Văn Việt...		Romance, Drama	a.k.a Bản lĩnh người đẹp 2 (Beauty's Bravery 2)
18 Feb	Nhà có ba chị em (Three Sisters)	1	VFC	Đỗ Thanh Hải (director); Trí Hùng, Thu Dung (writers); Trần Hạnh, Mai Thu Huyền, Kiều Thanh, Thu Quế, Trung Hiếu, Bình Minh, Bùi Bài Bình, Hồng Sơn, Bá Anh, Diễm Hằng...		Family, Romance, Drama	Airs as a part of Tet dramas series. Based on stage script of the same name by Thu Phương.
8 Apr-24 Jun	Gia đình thợ mỏ (A Miner's Family)	12	VFC	Phạm Thanh Phong (director); Phan Cao Toại, Phạm Thanh Phong (writers); Anh Thái, Diệu Thuần, Đàm Quang, Đàm Hằng, Quách Minh Phương, Bảo Nam, Công Lý, Trần Tường, Minh Phương, Chu Hùng, Hoàng Mai, Nguyễn Hai Long, Thu Hương, Hương Dung, Ninh Nguyệt, Tống Hoàng Hải, Hùng Nhân, Như Quỳnh, Nam Cường, Hồng Sơn, Phan Long, Bích Hằng, Cao Khải, Hữu Hùng, Quang Hưng, Phương Linh, Thu An, Mai Phương, Đức Chinh, Phan Minh, Thành Đông, Lê Thắng, Thanh Vân, Bùi Dung, Nguyễn Dung, Lê Thu, Thu Lương, Bích Hợi, Huy Mạnh, workers at Hà Tư, Đông Bắc, Mông Dương coal companies, Quảng Ninh stage actor and actress...	'Gia đình thợ mỏ' theme song by Mai Hoa	Drama, Family	
1 Jul-9 Sep	Phóng viên thử việc (Trainee Reporters)	11	VFC	Trần Quốc Trọng (director); Nguyễn Văn Vỹ (writer); Vi Cầm, Quang Huy, Bích Huyền, Bảo Anh, Phú Kiên, Đức Trung, Thùy Anh, Quang Minh, Ngọc Tản, Ngọc Thụ, Phương Khanh, Trần Quốc Trọng, Ngọc Thu, Thu An, Diễm Lộc, Tô Kim Phụng, Mậu Hòa, Phạm Quang Dũng, Văn Lâm, Văn Mỹ, Văn Túy, Huyền Trang, Thanh Phương...	'Phóng viên thử việc' theme song by Mai Hoa	Drama, Business	
16 Sep-7 Oct	Khát vọng công lý (Hunger for Justice)	4	VFC	Nguyễn Anh Tuấn (director); Hồng Sơn, Thanh Giang, Thanh Tùng...		Legal, Crime, Drama	
14 Oct-11 Nov	Mùa trăng khuyết (Season of Waning Moon)	5	VFC	Lê Cường Việt (director); Nguyễn Xuân Hải (writer); Vi Hương, Văn Lượng, Trần Tuấn, Anh Thái, Thanh Hiền, Lê Nga, Hồng Kiên, Ánh Loan, Trung Cường, Trung Thực, Mạnh Tùng, Thế Lưu...	'Mùa trăng khuyết' theme song by Vi Thảo	Drama, Romance, Ethnic	
18-25 Nov	Những người bạn (Friends)	2	VFC	Nguyễn Hữu Phần (director & writer); Trần Quốc Trọng, Phương Thảo, Trung Sơn, Thanh Lê, Hoàng Dũng, Trọng Phan, Lan Hương, Vĩnh Bảo, Mỹ Bình, Mạnh Hưng, Hương Quỳnh, Ngọc Dung, Đức Tú...		Drama	
2 Dec 2007- 3 Feb 2008	Làng ven đô (Suburban Village)	9	VFC	Đỗ Chí Hướng (director); Nguyễn Thành Văn (writer); Thanh Mai, Xuân Dương, Tuấn Dương, Đình Xuyên, Khôi Nguyên, Mai Ngọc Căn, Hoàng Huy, Nguyễn Thu Hà, Minh Tuấn, Sỹ Toàn, Thái Hòa, Mạnh Kiểm, Công Vượng, Hoàng Thắng, Ngọc Anh, Ngọc Thư, Cao Cường, Mai Hòa, Tiến Lộc, Trần Nhượng, Minh Nguyệt, Thanh Hiền, Ánh Nguyệt, Viết Sơn, Lâm Thanh, Hồng Quang, Bùi Nga, Hương Chanh, Hữu Phương, Hồng Chương...	'Làng ven đô' theme song by Trần Thu Hà	Rural, Political, Drama	

== See also ==
- List of dramas broadcast by Vietnam Television (VTV)
- List of dramas broadcast by Hanoi Radio Television (HanoiTV)
- List of dramas broadcast by Vietnam Digital Television (VTC)
