= List of VTV dramas broadcast in 2011 =

This is a list of VTV dramas released in 2011.

←2010 - 2011 - 2012→

== VTV Tet dramas ==
=== VTV1 ===
These dramas air from 20:05 to 20:55 on VTV1 during the period of Tet.

Broadcast	Title	Eps.	Prod.	Cast and crew	Theme song(s)	Genre	Notes
24 Jan-1 Feb	Tháng củ mật (One Month Before Tet)	9	FPT Media	Nguyễn Danh Dũng (director); Đặng Thiếu Ngân, Vũ Hạnh (writers); Công Lý, Vân Dung, Quang Thắng, Xuân Tùng, Hồ Liên, Tiến Đạt, Như Quỳnh, Lý Thanh Kha, Kim Xuyến, Hải Anh...	Tình khúc xuân (Spring Love Song) by Thùy Chi	Comedy, Rural	Airs from 21st to 29th Lunar December
7-11 Feb	Ai cũng có Tết (Everybody Deserves Tet)	5	VTV and TVPlus	Nguyễn Phương Điền (director); Hoàng Anh (writer); Bình Minh, Tú Vi, Hoài Linh, Cát Phượng, Lê Bình, Thanh Thủy, Công Ninh, Kim Phượng, Ngọc Thảo, Hoàng Phi, Văn Huy, Nguyên Khôi, Ánh Hồng...	Bắt sóng cảm xúc (Catch the Feelings) by Wanbi Tuấn Anh	Comedy, Family	Airs from 5th to 9th Lunar January
14-19 Feb	Đếm ngược cho đến 30 (Countdown to 30)	6	VFC	Trịnh Lê Phong (director); Đặng Dung, Vân Anh (writers); Kim Oanh, Vi Cầm, Ánh Tuyết, Hồng Quang, Hữu Phương, Ngọc Quỳnh, Chí Trung, Diệu Hương, Thùy Dương, Xuân Tiến, Hoàng Huy, Hồng Hạnh, Phương Hạnh, Quang Hưng, Hải Anh, Quang Anh, Nguyễn Thu Hà, Văn Đô, Thu Lan, Quang Thắng, Thanh Dương, Thu Trang...	Nụ hôn bất ngờ (A Sudden Kiss) by Mỹ Dung	Comedy, Romance	Airs from 12th to 17th Lunar January

=== VTV3 ===
These dramas air on VTV3 during the period of Tet.

Broadcast	Title	Eps.	Prod.	Cast and crew	Theme song(s)	Genre	Notes
31 Jan-6 Feb	Một tuần làm dâu (One-week Bride)	7	VFC	Mai Hồng Phong (director); Lê Thu Thủy, Đàm Vân Anh (writers); Bảo Linh, Mạnh Quân, Lê Quỳnh Trang, Trần Hằng, Đoàn Trọng Bình, Huyền Thanh, Diệp Bích, Phạm Cường, Phạm Anh Dũng, Ngân Hoa, Hoài Anh, Lệ Mỹ, Hùng Nhân, Hoàng Tùng, Xuân Hảo, Xuân Nghĩa, Việt Thường...	Nơi mùa xuân đến (Where Spring Is Coming To) by Khánh Linh & Kiên Trung	Comedy, Family	Airs 10:00-10:50, 28th to 4th Tet holiday
3-8 Feb	C13 đón Tết (C13 Welcomes Tet)	6	VTV and Smart Media JSC	Đào Duy Phúc (director); Đào Thùy Trang (writer); Minh Hương, Lý Chí Huy, Thiện Tùng, Kim Xuyến, Phú Đôn, Lương Giang, Trúc Mai, Vĩnh Xương, Ngọc Thoa...	Xuân diệu kỳ (Magical Spring) by Dương Hoàng Yến	Comedy	Airs 22:00-22:50, 1st to 6th Tet holiday
9-13 Feb	Nụ hôn đầu xuân (A Kiss in Early Spring)	5	V-Art Films	Nguyễn Hữu Phần, Xuân Phước (directors); Đỗ Phú Vinh, Nguyễn Hữu Phần (writers); Đan Trường, Nguyệt Ánh, Hoài Linh, Châu Gia Kiệt, Huỳnh Đông, Ngọc Xuân, Thùy Dung, Huỳnh Anh Tuấn, Uyên Trinh, Huỳnh Văn Đua, Hải Lý, Ngọc Tường, Quỳnh Như, Kiều Loan...	Nụ hôn đầu (First Kiss) by Hoàng Nghi Lâm; Dây đủng đỉnh buồn (Sad Story of the Fishtail Palm Tree) by Đan Trường	Comedy, Romance	Airs 22:15-23:00, 7th to 11th Tet holiday

== VTV1 Weeknight Prime-time dramas ==
=== Monday-Wednesday dramas ===
These dramas air from 20:05 to 20:55, Monday to Wednesday on VTV1.

Broadcast	Title	Eps.	Prod.	Cast and crew	Theme song(s)	Genre	Notes
21 Feb (stopped)	Hãy cùng em điệu Sarikakeo (Dance With Me Sarikakeo)	1/30	VTV and Southern Golden Film	Trương Sơn Hải (director); Hồng Xuân (writer); Quang Sự, Lê Hà, Ngọc Thuận, Siu Black, Quốc Lâm, Hồng Kim Hạnh, Khả Sinh, Quốc Lâm, Minh Đáng, Quang Hiếu, Lê Nhật Anh Thư, Vũ Minh Hiền, Quách Tỉnh, Phi Điểu, Mã Văn Thắng, Duy Hòa...	'Hãy cùng em điệu Sarikakeo' theme song	Romance, Drama, Ethnic	Stopped after 1 ep due to negative reviews of content deviations
7 Mar-30 May	Xin thề anh nói thật (I Swear That's the Truth)	35	FPT Media	Phi Tiến Sơn, Nguyễn Hữu Trọng (directors); Nguyễn Quỳnh Trang (writer); Jennifer Phạm, Danh Tùng, Hà Xuyên, Tiến Đạt, Minh Châu, Thúy Hạnh, Kim Hoàn, Lương Giang, Tuấn Quang, Đức Hải, Diệu Hương, Vân Hà, Diễm Hằng, Anh Quân, Minh Hà, Mai Hương, Cường Việt, Minh Phong, Ngọc Dung...	Xin thề anh nói thật (I Swear That's the Truth) by Đinh Mạnh Ninh; Thật lòng yêu anh (Truly Love You) by Dương Hoàng Yến	Romance, Comedy	
6 Jun-31 Aug	Chủ tịch tỉnh (Provincial Chairman)	38	VFC	Bùi Huy Thuần, Bùi Quốc Việt (directors); Đình Kính (writer); Phạm Cường, Trần Nhượng, Minh Hòa, Tạ Minh Thảo, Lệ Thu, Tiến Mộc, Thanh Hiền, Minh Hằng, Đức Khuê, Vi Cầm, Văn Anh, Thanh Hoa, Ngọc Quỳnh, Vân Anh, Thùy Hương, Hồng Sơn, Trần Thụ, Thế Bình, Hương Dung, Phú Thăng, Thanh Nhàn, Thanh Duyên, Anh Thái, Tiến Minh, Linh Huệ, Phương Hạnh, Đào Hoàng Yến, Sĩ Toàn...	Dòng đời (Stream of Life) by Tiến Minh	Political, Drama	
5 Sep-5 Dec	Followed by the playback of Những đứa con biệt động Sài Gòn (Children Between The Saigon). The drama was first released on THVL channel in the same year.						
6 Dec 2011- 17 Apr 2012	Vòng tròn cạm bẫy (Circle of Pitfalls)	52	VTV, IBGroup and Tincom Media	Bùi Tuấn Dũng (director); Hồng Anh, Bùi Tuấn Dũng (writers); Minh Tiệp, Thanh Thúy, Thiên Bảo, Tăng Bảo Quyên, Tuấn Tú, Kha Ly, Lân Bích, Minh Đức, Hoài An, Mai Dũng, Bảo Trí, Hứa Minh Đạt, Quách Hữu Lộc, Quách Ngọc Tuyên, Trần Chí Trung, Tuyền Mập, Ngọc Lan, Huỳnh Anh Tuấn, Công Nương, Nam Thư, Cung Phong, Lâm Na Anh...	'Vòng tròn cạm bẫy' opening song by Phạm Anh Khoa 'Vòng tròn cạm bẫy' ending song by Maya	Drama, Business, Crime	Adapted from Chinese novel of the same name by Wang Qiang

=== Thursday-Friday dramas ===
These dramas air from 20:05 to 20:55, Thursday and Friday on VTV1.

Broadcast	Title	Eps.	Prod.	Cast and crew	Theme song(s)	Genre	Notes
18 Mar-22 Jul	Cảnh sát hình sự: Ngôi biệt thự màu tro lạnh (Criminal Police: Cool-Ash-Coloured Villa)	36	VFC	Bùi Huy Thuần, Bùi Quốc Việt (directors); Nguyễn Long Khánh (writer); Thế Bình, Đỗ Kỷ, Minh Hòa, Lan Hương 'Bông', Trung Anh, Trần Nhượng, Nguyễn Hải, Minh Tuấn, Tạ Minh Thảo, Hồng Sơn, Phú Thăng, Tuấn Cường, Việt Thắng, Lê Quốc Thắng, Trúc Mai, Thúy Phương, Quỳnh Tứ, Bình Xuyên, Linh Huệ, Hoàng Anh Vũ...	Trở về cát bụi (Returning to the Dust) by Tiến Minh	Crime, Political, Drama	Airs 1 ep on Tue, 21 May
28 Jul-11 Nov	Cảnh sát hình sự: Chỉ còn lại tình yêu (Criminal Police: Only Love Remains)	30	VFC	Vũ Minh Trí (director); Đặng Minh Châu (writer); Thiên Bảo, Việt Anh, Huyền Trang, Phùng Thu Huyền, Thanh Hiền, Vũ Phan Anh, Hà Thu, Khánh Chi, Đào Hoàng Yến, Thanh Tú, Hoàng Hải, Văn Bích, Phương Oanh, Hoàng Minh, Duy Thanh, Minh Phương, Quốc Quân, Công Chi, Công Lý, Ngọc Quang...	Đến nơi bình yên (To a Quiet Place) by Lưu Hương Giang; Chỉ còn lại tình yêu (Only Love Remains) by Tiến Minh	Crime, Drama, Romance	
17 Nov 2011- 2 Mar 2012	Rừng chắn cát (Sand-blocking Forest)	28	VFC	Nguyễn Danh Dũng, Triệu Tuấn (directors); Nguyễn Thiên Vỹ (writer); Văn Kha, Quang Sự, Hồng Quân, Ngọc Dung, Hoàng Linh, Đăng Lưu, Thanh Tùng, Việt Thắng, Văn Hải, Thùy Trang, Lan Anh, Đào Duyên, Vi Cầm, Nguyễn Thu Hà, Thúy Hạnh, Xuân Thịnh...	Phi lao hát (Singing Casuarina) by Phương Anh	Drama, Romance, Scholastic	

== VTV3 Weeknight Prime-time dramas ==
=== Monday-Wednesday dramas ===
These dramas air from 21:10 to 22:00, Monday to Wednesday on VTV3.

Broadcast	Title	Eps.	Prod.	Cast and crew	Theme song(s)	Genre	Notes
8 Mar-20 Apr (cancelled)	Anh chàng vượt thời gian (The Guy Who Travels Through Time)	18/36	Viet Active LLC	Hoàng Thiên Trụ (director); Trương Thị Ngọc Ngân (writer); Hứa Vĩ Văn, Nhã Phương, Kim Hiền, Thu Minh, Huỳnh Anh Tuấn, Nhan Phúc Vinh, Don Nguyễn, Thủy Hương...		Fantasy, Drama	Cancelled after the first half due to negative feedback
25 Apr-22 Aug	Lời thú nhận của Eva (Eva's Confession)	52	Galaxy Studio	Nguyễn Mạnh Hà (director); Trịnh Đan Phượng, Ngọc Anh, Nguyễn Việt, Trịnh Cẩm Hằng, Nguyễn Thu Thủy, Nguyễn Mỹ Trang, Đoàn Mai Hoa (writers); Phan Minh Huyền, Hứa Vĩ Văn, Chiều Xuân, Thanh Tú, Lê Quốc Thắng, Minh Hà, Trần Đức, Trần Chí Trung, Tuyết Liên, Nguyễn Văn Đức, Lê Văn Học...	Em đã yêu anh (I Fell in Love with You) by Dương Hoàng Yến; Mơ được bên nhau (Dream of Being Together) by Dương Hoàng Yến & Khắc Hiếu	Romance, Comedy, Drama	
23 Aug-21 Nov	Người mẫu (Models)	39	Kiet Tuong LLC	Nguyễn Minh Chung (director); Bình Minh, Thanh Hằng, Trương Thế Vinh, Trương Minh Cường, Lê Bình, Lân Bích, Đức Thịnh, Huệ Minh, Sơn Tùng, Xuân Lan, Dương Mỹ Linh, Trần Thu Kiều, Anh Tuấn, Bảo Trúc...		Drama, Romance, Business	Based on Korean drama Model (SBS 1997)
23 Nov 2011- 29 Feb 2012	Khát vọng thượng lưu (Upper Class Hunger)	40	VietCom Film	Nguyễn Dương (director); Nam Quốc Team (writers); Bình Minh, Vũ Thu Phương, Elly Trần, Hiếu Hiền, Nguyễn Dương, Trung Dân, Kim Phương, Quốc Thuận, Thu Tuyết, Dương Nhật Vy, Lê Thiện, Tuyết Trinh...	Khát vọng thượng lưu (Upper Class Hunger) by Nguyễn Đình Vũ	Drama	

=== Thursday-Friday dramas ===
These dramas air from 21:10 to 22:00, Thursday and Friday on VTV3.

Broadcast	Title	Eps.	Prod.	Cast and crew	Theme song(s)	Genre	Notes
11 Feb-15 Apr	Cảnh sát hình sự: Đầm lầy bạc (Criminal Police: Silver Swamp)	20	VFC	Bùi Quốc Việt (director); Trần Thục Uyên, Nguyễn Trung Dũng (writers); Trần Đức, Thanh Quý, Tạ Minh Thảo, Thanh Hoa, Phùng Tiến Minh, Quỳnh Tứ, Tuấn Cường, Hồng Hải, Pha Lê, Tùng Dương, Nguyễn Hải, Chu Hùng, Quang Sự, Bảo Anh, Hoàng Tùng, Văn Báu...	Đến nơi bình yên (To a Quiet Place) by Lưu Hương Giang	Crime, Drama	Ep 10 airs on Saturday, 12 Mar
21 Apr-9 Sep	Huyền sử thiên đô (Legend of the Capital Transfer)	42; Pt.1: 20e Pt.2: 22e	VTV and World Star Group	Đặng Tất Bình, Phạm Thanh Phong, Nguyễn Thế Vinh, Phạm Duy Thanh (directors); Nguyễn Mạnh Tuấn (writer); Công Dũng, Bebe Phạm, Duy Thanh, Trung Dũng, Bá Anh, Trí Tuệ, Hà Xuyên, Giáng My, Trần Tường, Mạnh Trường, Thu Quỳnh, Trọng Khôi, Trần Nhượng, Viết Liên, Thu Hiền, Hoàng Long, Lâm Tùng, Rich Ting Nguyễn, Tuấn Phong, Quân Anh, Xuân Nam, Huy Trinh, Bảo Nam, Hoài Nam, Tùng Linh, Tạ Vũ Thu, Trịnh Mai Nguyên, An Ninh, Bình Xuyên, Phú Đôn...	'Huyền sử thiên đô' opening song by Tùng Dương 'Huyền sử thiên đô' ending song by Hương Giang	Historical, Period, Drama	Produced in order to celebrate 1000 yrs of TL-HN. Originally 72 eps (3 pts) but stopped producing due to budget shortfall.
(removed)	Lý Công Uẩn: Đường tới thành Thăng Long (Lý Công Uẩn: The Road to Thăng Long)	19	Trường Thành Media Co.	Jin Demao, Tạ Huy Cường (directors); Trịnh Văn Sơn, Ke Zhanghe (writers); Tiến Lộc, Thụy Vân, Hoàng Hải, Phan Hòa, Trung Hiếu, Mạnh Quân, Thiện Tùng, Văn Bích, Ngô Hồng Thái, Phạm Anh Dũng, Đỗ Nhật Nam, Đức Sơn, Nông Dũng Nam, Nguyễn Hoàng Nam, Mai Ngọc Căn, Anh Thái, Văn Báu, Phan Cẩm Thượng, Xuân Trường, Kim Hoàn, Khôi Nguyên, Phát Triệu, Ngô Huy Hoàng, Trần Chí Trung, Đỗ Thị Cử, Thái Duy, Xuân Khôi, Văn Học, Sĩ Hoài, Thanh Tùng, Trần Quốc Tuấn, Trung Sơn, Huy Trinh, Huy Cường, Ngọc Quỳnh.../ Lưu Thành Đạt, Phùng Hoa Hoài Linh	Hào khí ngàn năm (Thousand Years Magnanimity) by Quang Hào	Biography, Historical, Drama	Celebrating 1000 Years of TL-HN. Filmed in Vietnam and China. Planned to be released after Huyền sử thiên đô Pt.1 (on 30 Jun) but cancelled due to deviant & extraneous factors. Later released on VTV5 in 2025.
15 Sep 2011- 5 Jul 2012	Cầu vồng tình yêu (Rainbow of Love)	85	VFC	Vũ Hồng Sơn, Trọng Trinh, Bùi Tiến Huy (directors); Đặng Thiếu Ngân, Đặng Diệu Hương, Nguyễn Thu Thủy, Vân Anh, Hồng Hạnh (writers); Hồng Đăng, Hồng Diễm, Anh Thái, Trọng Trinh, Tạ Am, Hương Dung, Kim Oanh, Hải Anh, Phan Anh, Huỳnh Anh, Diệu Hương, Đan Lê, Minh Nguyệt, Kim Ngân, Minh Tiến, Lương Giang, Huyền Trang, Viết Thái, Thu Hương, Hằng Nga, Vũ Thu Hoài, Hoàng Xuân, Thanh Dương, Đồng Thanh Bình, Tiến Ngọc, Khôi Nguyên, Hữu Độ, Thanh Tân, Văn Toản, Tiến Mộc, Ngọc Thoa, Nông Dũng Nam...	Hãy mở cửa nhé tình yêu (Let's Open the Door of Love) by Hồ Quỳnh Hương Cảm ơn cuộc đời (Thank You For Life) by Artista Band	Family, Romance, Drama	Based on Korean drama Family's Honor (SBS 2008–2009). Airs 1 ep on Tue, 22 Nov.

== VTV3 Rubic 8 dramas ==
These dramas air from 14:30 to 15:15, Saturday and Sunday on VTV3 as a part of the program Rubic 8.

Broadcast	Title	Eps.	Prod.	Cast and crew	Theme song(s)	Genre	Notes
8 Jan-27 Mar	Nếu chỉ là giấc mơ (If It's Just a Dream)	24	VFC and Galaxy Studio	Nguyễn Tiến Dũng, Trần Quang Vinh (directors); Phạm Cường, Minh Hòa, Ngọc Thoa, Phùng Thu Huyền, Mạnh Trường, Hà My, Ngọc Quỳnh, Mẫn Đức Kiên, Bùi Thùy Linh, Sỹ Hoài, Hải Yến, Lê Quốc Thắng, Trần Chí Trung, Thùy Dương, Văn Bích...	Trong những giấc mơ (In Dreams) by Ngọc Anh & Tấn Minh	Drama, Family	
2 Apr-17 Jul	Làm bố thật tuyệt (Fathering Is Great!)	32	Galaxy Studio	Nguyễn Mạnh Hà (director); Phương Hạnh, Thùy Trang, Hà Anh Thu, Phương Hoa, Mỹ Trang, Thu Thủy, Đan Phượng, Cẩm Hằng, Khánh Hà, Trần Thị Thu, Tường Anh (writers); Danh Tùng, Đinh Hoàng Yến, Trần Chí Trung, Thanh Hà, Trịnh Xuân Thịnh, Như Quỳnh, Thanh Hiền, Đỗ Lan Hương, Thanh Mai, Trần Tuấn, Phạm Thu Thủy, Hoàng Linh...	'Làm bố thật tuyệt' opening song by Mỹ Nhung 'Làm bố thật tuyệt' ending song by Khắc Hiếu	Comedy, Romance	
23 Jul-7 Aug	Tiếng gọi từ trái tim (Calling From The Heart)	6	VFC and Galaxy Studio	Nguyễn Tiến Quang (director); Đặng Linh (writer); Quỳnh Trang, Ngô Hồng Thái, Anh Đức, Quốc Trị, Thùy Liên, Hải Yến, Minh Tiến, Hồng Vân, Thu Hoài, Huệ Đàn, Huệ Hát, Nam Cường, Nguyễn Chí Thanh...	Nhịp phố (Street Beat) by Minh Châu	Romance, Drama	
13-28 Aug	Sức ép tông đường (Lineage Pressure)	6	VFC and Galaxy Studio	Trịnh Lê Phong (director); Đặng Thiếu Ngân (writer); Đức Khuê, Minh Hằng, Lê Mai, Thanh Tú, Đức Hiệp, Thái An, Vân Navy, Mạnh Thái, Thanh Huyền, Kim Thoa, Tùng Anh, Minh Phương, Đức Tiến...	'Sức ép tông đường' theme song by My Nhung, Hoài Nam, Quốc Huy & Phương Thùy	Comedy, Family	
3 Sep-18 Dec	Khúc ca cho tình nhân (Song For Lovers)	32	VFC	Bùi Quốc Việt (director); Hồng Vân, Trịnh Khánh Hà, Nguyễn Thu Hà, Nguyễn Thúy Minh (writers); Trần Nhượng, Thanh Quý, Thanh Hiền, Huyền Thanh, Thanh Hoa, Kim Ngọc, Bảo Anh, Hoàng Anh Vũ, Tùng Anh, Chi Hoa...	Khúc ca cho tình nhân (Song For Lovers) by Tiến Minh	Drama, Romance	
24 Dec 2011- 11 Mar 2012	Mùa tinh khôi (A Brand New Summer)	24	VFC and Galaxy Studio	Đào Duy Phúc (director); Nguyễn Mỹ Trang, Nguyễn Thu Thủy, Trịnh Khánh Hà, Trịnh Đan Phượng, Trịnh Cẩm Hằng, Giáp Kiều Hưng, Mai Như Ngọc (writers); Hương Giang, Viết Liên, Thùy Liên, Diệu Thuần, Đình Chiến, Vân Navy, Thành Trung, Lâm Tùng, Nhật Linh, Hồng Lê, Đỗ Lan Hương, Mạnh Hùng, Thái Duy, Thanh Ngọc, Thanh Duyên, Văn Dương, Doãn Quốc Đam...	Trong vắt môi cười (Pure Smiling Lips) by Văn Mai Hương	Romance, Family, Coming-of-Age	

== See also ==
- List of dramas broadcast by Vietnam Television (VTV)
- List of dramas broadcast by Hanoi Radio Television (HanoiTV)
- List of dramas broadcast by Vietnam Digital Television (VTC)
