= List of VTV dramas broadcast in 2008 =

This is a list of VTV dramas released in 2008.

←2007 - 2008 - 2009→

== VTV Tet dramas ==
These short dramas air on VTV channels during Tet holiday.

=== VTV1 ===
Broadcast	Title	Eps.	Prod.	Cast and crew	Theme song(s)	Genre	Notes
6 Feb	Giấc mộng lên đời (How to Upgrade My Life)	1 (70′)	VFC	Lê Cường Việt (director); Đỗ Bảo Châu (writer); Quốc Trị, Lê Nga, Anh Thái, Nguyễn Thu Hà, Bình Trọng, Phương Khanh, Văn Lượng, Trần Quang, Bích Thủy, Trần Hùng, Bảo Minh, Điền Viên, Hữu Bắc...		Drama, Comedy	Airs 9:30, 30th Tet holiday
7 Feb	Khi ti-vi nhà tắt tiếng (When the TV is Muted)	1	VFC	Trọng Trinh (director); Đỗ Bảo Châu (writer); Đức Khuê, Thanh Tú...		Comedy, Marriage	Airs 9:30, 1st Tet holiday
8 Feb	Nắng xuân về (Spring Sunshine Has Come)	1 (100′)	VFC	Đỗ Chí Hướng (director); Phạm Minh Châu (writer); Đồng Thanh Bình, Nguyễn Thị Mai, Triệu Minh Lâm, Hoàng Huy, Hồng Minh, Cao Cường, Nguyễn Thị Hồng, Chí Trung...		Drama, Romance, Ethnic	Airs 9:30, 2nd Tet holiday
8 Feb	Xuân Cồ đánh ghen (Xuân Cồ Story: A Scene of Jealousy)	1 (80′)	VFC	Vũ Minh Trí (director); Khuất Quang Thụy (writer); Trung Hiếu, Công Lý, Tiến Minh, Ngọc Dung, Vân Anh, Thanh Hà, Bình Trọng...	Xuân cười (Spring to Smile) by Thùy Chi & Tiến Minh	Comedy, Rural	Airs 21:20, 2nd Tet holiday

=== VTV3 ===
Broadcast	Title	Eps.	Prod.	Cast and crew	Theme song(s)	Genre	Notes
7 Feb	Úm ba la cả nhà làm giám đốc (Abracadabra! We're Bosses)	1	VFC	Bùi Huy Thuần (director); Nguyễn Long Khánh (writer)		Drama, Comedy	Airs 11:30, 1st Tet holiday
8 Feb	Đầu bếp và đại gia (The Giant and The Chef)	1 (90′)	Đông A Pictures	Trịnh Lê Phong (director); Đỗ Trí Hùng (writer); Vĩnh Xương, Kim Oanh, Thùy Dung, Phú Đôn, Đình Chiến, Lâm Tùng, Bùi Bài Bình, Tạ Thu, Quang Lâm, Quốc Quân...	Sắp mưa ngâu (About to Rain Like Cry); Chèo folk song	Comedy, Romance	Airs 21:10, 2nd Tet holiday

== VTV1 Weeknight Prime-time dramas ==
These dramas air from 20:10 to 21:00, Monday to Friday on VTV1.

- Note: From 21 August to 14 November, the time slot was spit in two with Bỗng dưng muốn khóc aired on Monday to Wednesday & Nhà có nhiều cửa sổ aired on Thursday and Friday.

Broadcast date	Title	Eps.	Prod.	Cast and crew	Theme song(s)	Genre	Notes
21 Jan-1 Feb	Cảnh sát hình sự: Tên sát nhân có tài mở khóa (Criminal Police: The Murderer With Lock Picking Skills)	10	VFC	Trọng Trinh (director); Nguyễn Thanh Hoàng (writer); Quốc Trị, Trọng Trinh, Bảo Anh, Tạ Am, Hồng Sơn, Thanh Hiền, Nguyễn Thu Hà, Tiến Lộc, Hồng Hạnh, Trần Thụ, Văn Thới, Trà My, Đức Khuê, Linh Huệ, Hồng Quân, Công Dũng, Huyền Thanh, Ngọc Tản, Minh Phương, Quốc Hùng, Hà Đan, Sơn Tùng, Tiến Việt, Khả Sinh, Bảo Nam, Thanh An...	Những bàn chân lặng lẽ (Quiet Steps) by Thùy Dung	Crime, Drama, Thriller	Based on the novel 'Tên sát nhân có tài mở khóa' by Nguyễn Thanh Hoàng
4-5 Feb	Followed by the playback of Nắng ở trên đầu (Sunshine Above). The drama was first released on HTV7 channel in 2001.						
11-26 Feb	Followed by the playback of Ninh Thạnh Lợi - Đất và lửa (Ninh Thạnh Lợi: Land and Fire). The drama was first released on BLTV channel in 2006. Note: Episode 9 aired 21:25 to 22:20 on 21 Feb due to a special event.						
28 Feb-24 Mar	Followed by the playback of Nữ bác sĩ (A Doctor Like Her). The drama was first released on HTV9 channel in 2007.						
25 Mar-25 Apr	Chàng trai đa cảm (Emotional Guy)	19	Đông A Pictures	Trần Trung Dũng (director); Đỗ Trí Hùng (idea); Nguyễn Quỳnh Trang, Hà Anh Thu, Đàm Vân Anh, Lê Thu Thủy, Vũ Thị Liên (writers); Công Dũng, Thu Trang, Hà Anh, Đức Khuê, Ngọc Oanh, Minh Châu, Joe Rueller, Việt Anh, Hồng Diễm, Như Hương, Bích Huyền, Đỗ Quỳnh Hoa...	Thức dậy đi em (Wake up, honey) by Tùng Dương	Romance, Comedy, Drama	First socialized drama on VTV1
28 Apr-13 Jun	Cảnh sát hình sự: Chạy án 2 (Criminal Police: Cheating Justice 2)	27	VFC	Vũ Hồng Sơn (director); Nguyễn Như Phong (writer); Văn Báu, Dũng Nhi, Hương Dung, Việt Anh, Phan Hòa, Tiến Đạt, Trần Đức, Duy Thanh, Nguyễn Hải, Anh Thái, Thu Hương, Tuấn Minh, Thu Hằng, Hồng Sơn, Nguyễn Hoàng Tùng, Nguyễn Hậu, Hải Bình, Kim Dung, Vũ Hồng Anh...	Những bàn chân lặng lẽ (Quiet Steps) by Thùy Dung	Crime, Drama	Following up Chạy án (2006). Adapted from the novel 'Chạy án' by Nguyễn Như Phong.
16-30 Jun	Gió từ Phố Hiến (The Wind From Phố Hiến)	10	VFC	Vũ Minh Trí (director); Dũng Nhi, Trần Nhượng, Quang Thắng, Tiến Minh, Hoàng Lan, Khôi Nguyên, Hồ Liên, Trương Thu Hà, Hồng Chương...	Gió từ Phố Hiến (The Wind From Phố Hiến) by Tiến Minh	Political, Drama, Rural	
1 Jul-6 Aug	Vòng nguyệt quế (Laurel Wreath)	25	VFC	Mai Hồng Phong (director); Hà Thủy Nguyên (writer); Bích Huyền, Công Dũng, Lâm Tùng, Diệu Hương, Phạm Cường, Đỗ Quỳnh Hoa, Hà Văn Trọng, Anh Thư, Anh Dũng, Huyền Thanh, Phạm Ngọc Thăng, Hoa Thúy, Mẫn Đức Kiên...	'Vòng nguyệt quế' theme song	Drama, Romance	
7-20 Aug	Cảnh sát hình sự: Hành trình bí ẩn (Criminal Police: Mysterious Journeys)	10	VFC	Nguyễn Tiến Dũng, Trần Trọng Khôi (directors); Vũ Liêm, Mạnh Tuấn (writers); Bảo Anh, Tùng Dương, Lương Giang, Thu Hà, Đức Trung, Đức Thuận, Thế Bình, Phương Khanh, Văn Báu, Ngô Ngọc Trung, Minh Phương, Thái An, Hồng Đức, Hồng Quang, Sỹ Hoài, Đặng Thanh Hải, Hán Huy Bách, Đào Huy Hoàng, Đức Hưng, Đình Chiến...	Những bàn chân lặng lẽ (Quiet Steps) by Thùy Dung	Drama, Crime	
21 Aug-14 Nov	Nhà có nhiều cửa sổ (House of Many Windows)	26	VFC	Vũ Hồng Sơn, Phí Tiến Sơn (directors); Anji Loman Field (writer); Lê Mai, Hồng Sơn, Minh Hòa, Trung Anh, Tuấn Quang, Hoàng Xuân, Anh Tuấn, Hoàng Công, Huyền Trang, Lâm Tùng, Công Dũng, Tiến Lộc, Thu Quỳnh, Vi Cầm, Tùng Dương...	Hòa nhịp con tim (Heartbeats As One); Composed by Huy Tuấn; Performed by Thanh Lam, Hồng Nhung, Mỹ Linh, Trần Thu Hà, Mỹ Tâm, Đàm Vĩnh Hưng, Hồ Ngọc Hà, Hiền Thục, Tùng Dương, Minh Quân, Hà Anh Tuấn, Lưu Hương Giang, Hồ Hoài Anh, Phạm Anh Khoa, Đăng Khôi, Phương Anh, Phương Vy, Viết Thanh Unlimited...	Drama, Propa-ganda	Produced within the framework of the HIV / AIDS Prevention Project for young people. Airs on Thu-Fri.
25 Aug-12 Nov	Bỗng dưng muốn khóc (Suddenly I Wanna Cry)	36	BHD	Vũ Ngọc Đãng (director & writer); Tăng Thanh Hà, Lương Mạnh Hải, Hiếu Hiền, Thanh Thủy, Tùng Yuki, Đỗ Trung Quân, Trần Vân Anh, Tường Vi, Trọng Nghĩa, Lưu Minh Tuấn, Chí Thiện, Thủy Tiên, Thiên Kim, Ánh Loan, Nhật Trung, Quốc Thuận, Lê Hóa, Minh Thuận, Ngân Quỳnh, Nam Trung, Đăng Khoa, Lâm Hải Sơn...	Ta thuộc về nhau (We Belong Together) by Minh Thư Giây phút này (This Moment) by Lam Trường	Drama, Romance	Airs on Monday to Wednesday. Share the time slot with Nhà có nhiều cửa sổ.
17 Nov-24 Dec	Gió làng Kình (The Wind Inside Kình Village)	25	VFC	Nguyễn Hữu Phần, Bùi Thọ Thịnh (directors); Phạm Ngọc Tiến (writer); Bùi Bài Bình, Hồng Sơn, Công Lý, Đỗ Kỷ, Viết Liên, Trương Thu Hà, Lan Hương 'Bông', Hoàng Hải, Ánh Tuyết, Mai Lan, Bình Trọng, Phùng Cường, Quốc Quân, Nguyễn Hậu, Đình Chiến, Hồng Quân, Quang Lâm, Tùng Dương, Thanh Hà, Thanh Hòa, Hoàng Công, Trần Tuấn, Chiến Thắng...	Tìm (Looking For) by Minh Chuyên	Rural, Drama	Based on the novel of 'Những trận gió người' by Phạm Ngọc Tiến
25 Dec 2008- 22 Jan 2009	Cảnh sát hình sự: Cổ vật (Criminal Police: Relic)	20	VFC	Bùi Huy Thuần (director); Nguyễn Long Khánh (writer); Hương Dung, Duy Thanh, Minh Hòa, Đức Khuê, Phát Triệu, Thanh Tùng, Diệu Hương, Hồng Sơn, Tiến Mộc, Đức Long, Hoàng Long, Bình Xuyên, Đào Hùng, Khương Đức Thuận, Hồng Quang, Trần Đức, Anh Dũng, Vĩnh Toàn, Hoàng Tùng, Chu Hùng, Quốc Quân, Hoàng Dân, Thanh Hải, Hồng Lê, Mẫn Đức Kiên, Huyền Thanh, Minh Nguyệt, Ngọc Tản, Phương Khanh, Nam Cường...	Những bàn chân lặng lẽ (Quiet Steps) by Thùy Dung	Crime, Drama	

== VTV3 Weeknight Prime-time dramas ==
Starting on 2008, VTV opened new prime time slot for Vietnamese dramas on VTV3 channel.

=== Monday-Wednesday dramas ===
These dramas air from 21h to 21h50, Monday to Wednesday on VTV3.

Broadcast	Title	Eps.	Prod.	Cast and crew	Theme song(s)	Genre	Notes
11 Feb 2008- 31 Mar 2009	Cô gái xấu xí (Ugly Miracle)	176	VTV and BHD	Nguyễn Minh Chung (director); Thùy Linh (writer); Ngọc Hiệp, Chi Bảo, Lan Phương, Bình Minh, Phi Thanh Vân, Lý Anh Tuấn, Đức Hải, Minh Thuận, Cát Tường, Lê Giang, Quỳnh Trang, Minh Khuê, Phi Phụng, Thúy Uyên, Hồng Ân, Xuân Thùy, Ốc Thanh Vân, Đức Thịnh, Lê Bình, Diệu Đức, Lân Bích, Minh Đức, Trịnh Kim Chi, Bảo Trân, Bích Huyền, Thanh Thủy, Xuân Hồng, Thanh Diệp, Quang Hùng... Cameo: Thúy Hạnh & Minh Khang, Ngô Kiến Huy, Tăng Thanh Hà, Hiếu Hiền, Thu Minh, Lã Thanh Huyền, Tú Vi, Lê Khánh, Trung Dân	Cho em (For You) by Lam Trường; Đôi (Couple) by Minh Thuận; Những ngày vui (Days of Joy) by Hồng Ngọc; Huyền Diệu by Phương Thanh	Drama, Comedy, Romance	Based on Colombian telenovela 'You soy Betty, la fea'. First socialized drama in VTV3.

=== Thursday-Friday dramas ===
These dramas air from 21h to 21h50, Thursday and Friday on VTV3.

Broadcast	Title	Eps.	Prod.	Cast and crew	Theme song(s)	Genre	Notes
14 Feb 2008- 28 Aug 2009 (cancelled)	Những người độc thân vui vẻ (Happy Single Ones)	170	VFC and MESA	Đỗ Thanh Hải, Phạm Thanh Phong, Khải Anh, Trọng Trinh (directors); Đỗ Trí Hùng, Phạm Kim Anh (adapters); Quốc Khánh, Chí Trung, Minh Hằng, Vân Dung, Quang Thắng & various artists	Những người độc thân vui vẻ (Happy Single Ones) by Mỹ Linh & Minh Quân	Comedy, Drama	Based on Chinese sitcom 'The New House in Sunshine'. Last 23 eps airs on Thu to Sat (Jul 9-Aug 28 2009). Stopped producing due to negative feedback.

== VTV3 Cinema For Saturday Afternoon dramas ==
These dramas air in early Saturday afternoon on VTV3 with the duration approximately 70 minutes as a part of the program Cinema for Saturday afternoon (Vietnamese: Điện ảnh chiều thứ Bảy).

Broadcast	Title	Eps.	Prod.	Cast and crew	Theme song(s)	Genre	Notes
2 Feb-8 Mar	Dãy bàn 4 người (A Table of 4)	6	VFS	Đào Duy Phúc (director); Đào Thùy Trang, Lê Hồ Lan (writers); Thanh Hà, Trung Sơn, Trần Chí Trung, Đặng Linh, Vân Anh, Trần Đức, Thái Duy, Bích Thủy, Hồ Lan, Thanh Ngọc, Vân Hương, Tiến Hợi, Kim Dung, Tiến Đại, Tuấn Dương, Nguyễn Thị Hòa, Biên Cương, Hương Giang, Tùng Anh, Thiên Kiều...	Ước mơ tuổi 18 (Wishes at 18) by Thùy Chi	Romance, Scholastic, Drama	
15-22 Mar	Điệp vụ CK 999 (The Mission CK 999)	2	VFS	Trần Chí Thành (director); Trần Thanh Hồng, Đặng Trần Việt Hương (writers); Nguyễn Ngọc Khánh, Vũ Thành Long, Trần Anh Đức, Chu Hữu Tuấn, Trần Lê Mai Phương, Quỳnh Anh, Nguyễn Thành Nam, Hoàng Sơn, Diệp Bích, Hoàng Hà, Công Lý, Bình Xuyên, Tiến Hợi, Tuấn Dương, Mạnh Sinh, Kế Đoàn, Ngọc Thắng, Ngọc Thư...	'Điệp vụ CK 999' theme song by Vân Anh	Children, Comedy, Crime	
(removed)	Chàng trai cầu Ông Me (The Boy at Ông Me Bridge)	10	CFSA Club, Giải Phóng Film & THVL	Hồ Ngọc Xum (director); Nguyễn Kế Nghiệp (writer); Trần Ngọc Hùng, Bích Thảo, Sơn Thái, Tấn Phương, Phan Hùng, Hoàng Nhân, Thế Lữ, Huỳnh Văn Đua, Thanh Sâm, Cao Văn Hoàng, Hữu Đức, Kim Phượng, Hoài An, Hạnh Nguyên, Nguyễn Hậu, Cát Tường, Ý Như, Hoàng Tấn, Lâm Huỳnh Du, Hồng Phú Vinh, Đại Hải, Thanh Bình...		Biography, War, Drama, Period	Based on Phạm Hùng's life story. Planned to air on 29 Mar but removed.
29 Mar-31 May	Mường Động (Story in a Muong Village)	10		Dương Đức Quang, Trần Hạnh, Hoàng Công, Mạnh Cường, Mạnh Hưng, Hồ Kiều Oanh, Nguyệt Hằng...		Drama, Period, Ethnic	Adapted from novel of the same name by Nguyễn Hải
7-14 Jun	Xin đừng cách xa (Please Don't Go Away)	2		Vũ Duy Kiên (director); Minh Thu, Bùi Kim Quy (writers); Hoàng Vân Khanh, Thế Hoàng, Phạm Tuấn Hùng, Phạm Thúy Hằng, Thanh Hoa, Quốc Hùng, Thành An, Thùy Trang, Minh Nhân, Mạnh Dũng...	Xin đừng cách xa (Please Don't Go Away) by Hoàng Vân Khanh, Phạm Tuấn Hùng, Phạm Thúy Hằng	Romance, Drama, Musical	
21 Jun-12 Jul	Mùa báo bão (Storm Warning Season)	5		Nguyễn Hữu Đức (director & writer); Viết Liên, Minh Hòa, Thanh Tùng, Đàm Hằng, Thanh Hà, Thu Thủy, Tạ Am, Minh Nguyệt, Tuấn Dương, Huyền Thanh...	'Mùa báo bão' theme song	Drama, Family	
19-26 Jul	Khát vọng xanh (Youthful Passion)	2	VFS	Trần Chí Thành (director); Hoàng Thị Bích Xuân (writer); Hồng Nhung, Hà Duy, Tiến Lộc, Minh Phương, Văn Báu, Thanh Hương, Quang Vịnh, Ngọc Thư, Anh Dũng, Hoàng Hà...	'Khát vọng xanh' theme song by Phương Thu	Drama, Romance	
2-23 Aug	24 giờ phá án (24 Hours for a Case)	4				Drama, Crime	
30 Aug-27 Sep	Cuộc phiêu lưu không định trước (Unintended Adventure)	5	VFS	Hữu Mười (director); Trần Kỳ Trung (writer); Tùng Hinh...		Children, Drama, Adventure	Adapted from story of the same name by Trần Kỳ Trung
4 Oct-1 Nov	Những ngôi sao ban ngày (Daytime Stars)	5	HTD	Hoàng Thanh Du (director); Lê Minh Sơn (writer); Thanh Hà, Xuân Thảo, Tô Tiến, Đức Thuận, Quốc Việt, Hải Khoa, Hoàng Hải, Thùy Linh, Xuân Quyết, Thanh Dương, Hoàng Du Ka, Phi Long, Linh Huyền, Thúy Hà...	'Những ngôi sao ban ngày' theme song by Tiến Minh	Drama, Romance	
8 Nov-6 Dec	Xúc xắc tình yêu (Dice of Love)	5		Vũ Duy Kiên (director); Đoàn Mai Hoa (writer); Diễm Hương, Nguyễn Thùy Anh, Quốc Anh, Thế Hoàng, Thanh Ngà, Tạ Am, Mạnh Dũng, Thanh Ngọc, Mai Huyền, Minh Tiến, Khánh Hòa, Huyền Sâm, Việt Bách, Văn Kiểm, Huyền Thanh...	'Xúc xắc tình yêu' theme song by Thùy Dung	Romance, Drama	
13 Dec 2008- 14 Feb 2009	Đi tìm hạnh phúc (Searching For Happiness)	10	VFS	Đào Duy Phúc (director)		Drama	

== VTV3 Sunday Literature & Art dramas ==
These dramas air in early Sunday afternoon on VTV3 as a part of the program Sunday Literature & Art (Vietnamese: Văn nghệ Chủ Nhật).

Broadcast	Title	Eps.	Prod.	Cast and crew	Theme song(s)	Genre	Notes
10 Feb	Cho em một ngày vui (A Happy Day For You)	1 (80′)	VFC	Bùi Huy Thuần (director); Du An (writer); Thanh Thúy, Tuấn Quang, Duy Thanh, Bá Cường, Trần Nhượng, Hải Anh, Thúy Ngà...	'Cho em một ngày vui' theme song by Thùy Dương & Hoài Anh	Romance, Drama	
17 Feb	Mùa hè rớt (Residual Summer)	1 (90′)	VFC	Phạm Thanh Phong (director & writer); Hồng Sơn, Minh Phương, Thanh Giang, Vi Cầm, Nam Cường, Đức Trung, Diệp Anh, Anh Dũng, Ngọc Mai, Trần Hưng, Văn Bảy, Tùng Lâm, Khắc Nam...		Drama, Family	
24 Feb-27 Apr	Nếp nhà (Family Tradition)	10	VFC	Triệu Tuấn (director); Nguyễn Toàn Thắng (writer); Thanh Tùng, Ngọc Dung, Hoàng Công, Trúc Mai, Trần Hạnh, Thu Nguyệt, Minh Hòa, Huệ Đàn, Ánh Nguyệt, Hải Anh, Tuấn Dương, Tuấn Quang, Quốc Quân, Kim Xuyến, Thế Quân, Tiến Dũng, Đức Hải, Tuấn Việt, Phương Loan, Thu Hạnh, Kiều Chinh, Quốc Việt, Uy Linh...	'Nếp nhà' theme song	Family, Drama	
4 May	XU50	1 (70′)	VFC	Bùi Quốc Việt (director); Trần Thị Thục Quyên (writer); Bùi Bài Bình, Minh Phương, Mạnh Quân, Kiên Hoàng, Hương Mai, Dịu Hương, Hoàng Lan, Phú Thăng, Phương Lâm, Đức Anh...		Scholastic, Drama, Comedy	
11 May	A lô 1, 2, 3... (Hello 1, 2, 3...)	1	VFC	Công Lý...		Family, Slice-of-Life, Drama	
18 May-7 Sep	Những cánh hoa bay (Flying Petals)	17 (45′)	VFC	Bùi Huy Thuần (director); Hà Thúy, Hoàng Anh (writers); Thu Hiền, Mạnh Trường, Trần Nhượng, Lệ Thu, Mai Ngọc Căn, Duy Thanh, Thanh Quý, Hoàng Hải, Dũng Nhi, Hữu Độ, Quỳnh Tứ, Vũ Phan Anh, Trà My, Cao Cường, Danh Tùng, Mạnh Hùng, Trung Sơn, Thanh Hương, Thùy Linh, Thu Huyền, Bạch Diệp...	'Những cánh hoa bay' theme song by Thúy Lan	Drama, Romance	
14 Sep	Họ đã từng yêu như thế (They Used to Love Like That)	1 (83′)	VFC	Nguyễn Anh Tuấn (director & writer); Việt Thắng, Hải Khoa, Thiện Tùng, Thanh Hường, Bạch Quỳnh, Ngọc Quỳnh, Quốc Hùng, Mai Kiên, Thục Quyên, Hải Mạc, Ngô Chín, Vân Anh, Quỳnh Trang, Ngọc Hiếu, Khánh Hòa...		Romance, Drama, Post-war	
21 Sep	Giọt gianh (Cottage Drop)	1 (75′)	VFC	Đặng Diệu Hương (writer); Công Lý, Mai Mai, Hoàng Yến, Quang Lâm, Thục Anh, Phùng Cường...		Drama, Marriage, Rural, Comedy	Adapted from Phạm Ngọc Tiến's short story of the same name
28 Sep	Bước tới cầu vồng (Step to the Rainbow)	1 (70′)	VFC	Nguyễn Tiến Dũng (director)		Romance, Drama	
5 Oct-14 Dec	Những trận cầu đen (Dark Matches)	11	VFC	Đỗ Chí Hướng (director); Hán Huy Bách, Đồng Thanh Bình, Thanh Tùng, Bích Huyền...		Sports, Drama, Crime	
21 Dec	Thầy giáo trẻ (Young Teacher)	1 (80′)	VFC	Trần Quang Vinh (director); Nguyễn Toàn Thắng (writer); Hồng Đăng, Thu Hiền, Quốc Thành, Tuấn Anh, Đức Huy, Quốc Trị, Đức Trường, Thái An, Trần Thụ, Minh Nguyệt, Hồng Hạnh, Thúy Hạnh, Thu An, Mạnh Cường, Thanh Tùng...		Scholastic, Romance	
28 Dec	Cổ tích hiện đại (Modern Fairytale)	1 (65′)	VFC	Nguyễn Anh Tuấn (director); Bá Dũng, Nguyễn Yên Thế (writers); Bình Xuyên, Hương Oanh, Mạnh Hiệp...		Drama	

== See also ==
- List of dramas broadcast by Vietnam Television (VTV)
- List of dramas broadcast by Hanoi Radio Television (HanoiTV)
- List of dramas broadcast by Vietnam Digital Television (VTC)
