= List of VTV dramas broadcast in 2006 =

This is a list of VTV dramas released in 2006.

←2005 - 2006 - 2007→

== VTV Tet dramas ==
These films air on VTV channels during Tet holiday.

=== VTV1 ===
Broadcast	Title	Eps.	Prod.	Cast and crew	Theme song(s)	Genre	Notes
28 Jan	Cố hương (Hometown)	1 (75′)	VFC	Đỗ Chí Hướng (director); Lương Xuân Thủy (writer); Đức Trung, Minh Nguyệt, Lê Thanh Bảo, Lê Thu Na, Kiều Minh Hiếu, Trine Glue Đoàn, Cát Trần Tùng, Huyền Thanh, Trần Thục Anh...		Family, Slice-of-Life	Airs 07:30, 29th Tet holiday
29 Jan	Mái nhà xuân (Spring Under a Roof)	1 (80′)	VFC	Bùi Huy Thuần (director); Đặng Huy Quyền (writer); Văn Hiệp, Tiến Quang, Minh Vượng, Kim Xuyến, Hữu Nguyên, Anh Quân, Thu Nga, Bình Trọng, Thu Hiền, Hải Anh, Thành An...		Comedy, Rural	Airs 21:05, 1st Tet holiday

=== VTV3 ===
Broadcast	Title	Eps.	Prod.	Cast and crew	Theme song(s)	Genre	Notes
30 Jan	Xuân Cồ: Nhà thương thuyết (Xuân Cồ the Matchmaker)	1 (80′)	VFC	Vũ Minh Trí (director); Khuất Quang Thụy (writer); Phú Đôn, Công Lý...		Comedy, Romance	Airs 17:50, 2nd Tet holiday
31 Jan	Tết này ai đánh trống đình (Who Will Beat The Communal Drum This Tet?)	1 (90′)	VFC	Nguyễn Thế Hồng (director); Trần Đình Phương (writer); Quốc Long, Tuyết Liên, Ngọc Căn, Hồ Liên, Phương Loan, Xuân Đại, Diệu Linh, Quốc Anh...		Rural, Drama, Comedy	Airs 09:00, 3rd Tet holiday
31 Jan	Vệ sĩ (The Bodyguard)	1 (80′)	VFC	Phạm Thanh Phong (director & writer); Tự Long, Thành Trung, Vũ Hà, Hải Yến, Tạ Ngọc Mai, Phạm Phương Dung, Lại Phương Khanh, Ngô Minh Đức, Nam Cường, Văn Hồng, Tuấn Dương...	Yuusha-oh Tanjou! by Maasaki Endoh	Comedy, Fantasy	Airs 15:30, 3rd Tet holiday

== Vietnamese dramas in VTV1 Weeknight time slot ==
Starting in 2006, Saturday night was removed from VTV1 night drama time slot after 10 months added.

These dramas air from 21:05 to 21:55, Monday to Friday on VTV1.

- Note: Unlisted airtime periods were spent for foreign dramas.

Broadcast	Title	Eps.	Prod.	Cast and crew	Theme song(s)	Genre	Notes
3 Jan-15 Feb	Chuyện ở tỉnh lẻ (Story in a Province)	25	VFC	Đỗ Chí Hướng, Hoàng Lâm (directors); Phan Cao Toại, Hoàng Vân (writers); Minh Hòa, Duy Thanh, Trung Anh, Hồ Tháp, Thương An, Phú Thăng, Thanh Tùng, Việt Thắng, Tiến Hợi, Minh Tuấn, Thu Hường, Phú Đôn, Duy Trinh, Quốc Tuấn, Nguyễn Kiều Anh, Ánh Tuyết, Quỳnh Tứ, Minh Hằng, Hồng Hạnh, Văn Mỹ, Khôi Nguyên, Ngọc Thư, Xuân Vịnh, Vũ Hải, Trần Đức, Bích Thủy, Đào Hùng, Ngọc Dung, Văn Thành, Xuân Đồng, Hoàng Huy, Sỹ Toàn, Kế Đoàn, Kim Xuyến, Huyền Thanh, Minh Phương...	'Chuyện ở tỉnh lẻ' theme song	Drama, Political	
16 Feb-23 Mar	Followed by the playback of Ngọn nến hoàng cung (Candle in the Royal Palace), 2 episodes per night except the final episode. The drama was first released on HTV9 channel in 2004.						
24 Mar-10 Apr	Cảnh sát hình sự: Chuyên án chưa kết thúc (Criminal Police: Unclosed Case)	11	VFC	Bùi Huy Thuần (director); Trần Hoài Văn, Anh Vũ (writers); Duy Thanh, Minh Hòa, Hồng Sơn, Thanh Tùng, Hồng Minh, Việt Thắng, Quốc Khánh, Vân Hà, Thanh Hoa, Quỳnh Tứ, Mai Hoa...	Những bàn chân lặng lẽ (Quiet Steps) by Thùy Dung	Crime, Drama	Adapted from the novel of 'Hồ sơ chưa kết thúc' by Phùng Thiên Tân
11-21 Apr	Followed by the playback of Vùng ven một thời con gái (Suburban Women Warriors). The drama was first released on BTV1 channel in 2004.						
24 Apr-3 May	Followed by the playback of Làng Cát (Sand Village). The drama was first released on BTV channel in 2004.						
4-22 May	Cảnh sát hình sự: Lời sám hối muộn màng (Criminal Police: Belated Penitence)	11	VFC	Vũ Minh Trí (director); Trần Hoài Văn (writer); Trung Hiếu, Công Lý, Vũ Phan Anh, Văn Bích, Mỹ Duyên, Đàm Hằng, Kiều Minh Hiếu, Thanh Hiền, Hữu Độ, Hồng Quang, Minh Đức, Xuân Bình, Văn Anh, Tuấn Quang, Tạ Minh Thảo, Thu Quế, Anh Tuấn, Quốc Quân...	Những bàn chân lặng lẽ (Quiet Steps) by Thùy Dung	Crime, Drama	Adapted from the novel of 'Hồ sơ một tử tù' by Nguyễn Đình Tú
23 May-13 Jun	Followed by the playback of Lục Vân Tiên (The Tale of Lục Vân Tiên). The drama was first released on HTV7 channel in 2004.						
14 Jun-7 Jul	Miền quê thức tỉnh (Awakening Countryside)	18	VFC	Trọng Trinh, Hoàng Nhung (directors); Đậu Nữ Vệ (writer); Lê Vi, Quốc Trị, Hồng Sơn, Trọng Trinh, Thanh Hiền, Vân Anh, Đức Tùng, Hương Giang, Nguyễn Chung, Minh Nguyệt, Thương An, Phạm Thế Lộc, Thanh Tùng, Tuấn Minh, Xuân Dương, Tạ Thu, Duy Đông, Ngọc Thư, Thùy Liên, Tạ Am, Xuân Đổng, Hải Anh, Trần Dũng, Hồng Hạnh, Khôi Nguyên, Ngọc Tuấn, Hoàng Huy, Hoàng Hải, Trà My, Đại Mý, Mạnh Linh, Thanh Giang...	'Miền quê thức tỉnh' theme song Composed by Lê Vinh	Drama, Rural	
10 Jul-17 Aug	Followed by the playback of Dốc tình (Love On The Slope), 2 episodes per night except 2 last episodes. The drama was first released on HTV9 channel in 2005.						
18 Sep-24 Oct	Cảnh sát hình sự: Chạy án (Criminal Police: Cheating Justice)	22	VFC	Vũ Hồng Sơn (director); Nguyễn Như Phong (writer); Việt Anh, Phan Hòa, Dũng Nhi, Hương Dung, Văn Báu, Trần Đức, Tuấn Minh, Nguyễn Kiều Anh, Nguyễn Hải, Văn Thành, Tiến Đạt, Kim Dung, Quỳnh Tứ, Khôi Nguyên, Anh Thái, Hữu Độ, Thu Hương, Hồng Đức, Nguyễn Hậu, Mạnh Xuyên, Mạnh Hà, Thế Bình, Nguyễn Tu, Xuân Hảo...	Những bàn chân lặng lẽ (Quiet Steps) by Thùy Dung	Crime, Drama	Adapted from the novel of 'Chạy án' by Nguyễn Như Phong

== VTV3 Cinema For Saturday Afternoon dramas ==
These dramas air in early Saturday afternoon on VTV3 with the duration approximately 70 minutes as a part of the program Cinema for Saturday afternoon (Vietnamese: Điện ảnh chiều thứ Bảy).

Broadcast	Title	Eps.	Prod.	Cast and crew	Theme song(s)	Genre	Notes
18-25 Feb	Tình yêu chia sẻ (Love Division)	2		Nguyễn Thế Vinh (director); Đào Thùy Trang (writer); Kiều Anh, Hồng Quang, Diệu Thuần, Xuân Trường, Minh Hiền, Huyền Linh, Lan Anh, Trịnh Thúy, Cẩm Tú...		Drama, Marriage	
4-11 Mar	Cây bưởi ra hoa (Pomelo Blossom)	2		Trần Trung Dũng (director); Nguyễn Quỳnh Trang (writer); Thu Hằng, Quốc Khánh, Huyền Thanh, Trần Thụ, Thu Hương, Minh Nguyệt...		Drama	
18-25 Mar	Ôi! Mẹ chồng (Mothers-In-Law)	2		Nguyễn Mạnh Hà (director); Vũ Liêm, Trương Thị Sinh (writers); Kiều Thanh, Anh Quân, Tuyết Liên, Quang Lân, Kim Xuyến, Đức Khuê, Lê Mai, Ngọc Tuyết, Toàn Thanh, Tuấn Anh, Huyền Thanh, Kim Thúy, Bích Thùy, Thùy Dung, Ngọc Đại, Thùy Vân...	Step by a・chi-a・chi Kagayake!! Dagwon by Nieve (episode 1) Nekketsu! Yuusha Lamuness by Takeshi Kusao (episode 2) Khúc giao mùa (Melody of Changing Seasons) by Mỹ Linh & Minh Quân (episode 3)	Romance, Comedy, Marriage	Originally produced for Tet holiday with 3 episodes, but edited to 2 episodes upon release.
1-22 Apr	Nhịp xòe hoa (Rhythm of Flowering Dance)	4 (60′)	Hodafilm	Trần Vịnh (director); Nguyễn Thành Phong, Lò Ngọc Duyên (writers); Phương Thanh, Thanh Hiền, Thanh Quý, Nam Cường, Xuân Thảo, Viết Vinh, Viết Liên, Thúy Hường, Tiêu Dũng, Hoàng Thảo, Lưu Ly, Lưu Thái...	'Nhịp xòe hoa' theme song Composed by Đặng Hữu Phúc	Ethnic, Drama, Historical	
29 Apr-20 May	Những kẻ lãng mạn (The Romantic)	4	VFS	Hữu Mười (director); Võ Thị Xuân Hà, Nguyễn Toàn Thắng (writers); Thu Quế, Quỳnh Tú, Quốc Trị, Đức Sơn, Tạ Vũ Thu, Phạm Minh Huyền, Thanh Hà...		Drama	
27 May-3 Jun	Em không phải là đàn bà (I Am Not Woman)	2		Trần Lực (director); Hà Anh Thu (writer); Trần Lực, Thúy Hà, Hương Thảo, Duy Anh, Đức Khuê, Xuân Tùng, Huyền Thanh, Mạnh Quân, Hoàng Cúc, Thúy Nam, Diệu Hương, Minh Tâm, Quý Hải, Thanh Thảo, Trần Uy, Kiên Giang, Anh Thư, Cẩm Thy, Đoàn Giỏi, Kinh Quốc, Xuân Thắng, Mai Huyền, Hương Giang...	Ai wo +One by Hiromi Iwasaki OUR GOOD DAY･･･Bokura no GOOD DAY by Megumi Hayashibara	Drama, Family	
10-17 Jun	Chiếc thẻ SIM (The SIM card)	2 (60′)		Nguyễn Hữu Đức (director & writer); Vi Cầm, Bá Anh, Đàm Hằng, Thanh Tùng, Anh Dũng, Kim Xuân, Phương Nam, Nguyễn Thu Hà, Trần Thụ, Lâm Mạnh Hiệp, Tạ Thu, Bùi Đăng Văn, Đức Tuệ, Lê Thị Phúc, Thanh Tú, Hiền Dương, Hoàng Thị Liên, Nguyễn Dương An, Nguyễn Thu Trang, Đỗ Ngọc Toản, Hữu Đức...	Giấc mơ tình yêu (Dream of Love) by Ngọc Dung	Romance, Drama	
24 Jun-1 Jul	Sami, em ở đâu? (Where Are You, Sami?)	2		Nguyễn Thế Vĩnh (director); Nguyễn Xuân Hải (writer); Minh Hiền, Tuấn Quang, Huy Trinh, Quang Anh, Khôi Nguyên, Nguyễn Thị Liên, Lệ Mỹ, Vân Thắng, Tuấn Dương, Thanh Thuận, Xuân Hải, Minh Thêu, Nguyễn Thị Xuân, Thanh Hiền, Thế Hoàng, Văn Bình, Minh Phương, Văn Cường, Tuấn Thành, Thu Hương, Lê Thị Hà, Mai Nam, Đoan Trang...	Gatten Roll by Chiruru	Drama, Romance, Ethnic, Crime	
8-15 Jul	Dấu chân vào đời (Footprint Into Life)	2 (60′)		Phạm Quang Xuân (director); Nguyễn Văn Dân, Đàm Vân Anh (writers); Xuân Duy, Nhân Hậu, Thanh Tùng, Minh Tuấn, Đinh Hào, Nhật Nam, Kim Dung, Trần Tuấn, Huyền Thanh, Anh Dũng, Kim Thanh, Thi Nhung, Tiến Ngọc, Bảo Nam, Lê Thống, Đình Hải, Hữu Nghị, Kiều Loan...	Hallelujah Papaya by Yuka Sato	Drama, Office	
22-29 Jul	Tháng 13 (The Month 13)	2		Hoài Sơn, Quang Vinh (directors); Nguyễn Minh Quyên (writer); Trúc Mai, Minh Phương, Nhân Hậu, Nguyễn Thành Sơn, Thanh Bình, Xuân Dương, Văn Báu, Thanh Chi, Anh Tuấn, Vân Anh, Chu Văn Thức...		Drama, Romance, Youth	
5-12 Aug	Phó tổng giám đốc thời @ (@ Era Deputy General Manager)	2 (70′)		Phan Hữu Nguyên (director); Nguyễn Hữu Đức (writer); Ngọc Quỳnh, Phúc An, Uy Linh, Văn Lượng, Bình Trọng, Tạ Tuấn Minh, Trần Đức, Phương Khanh, Thương An, Đào Hùng, Anh Quân, Ngọc Dung, Trần Hùng, Thùy Dương...		Comedy, Romance	
19 Aug-2 Sep	Vùng cửa sóng (Inlet Zone)	3 (70′)		Nguyễn Huy Hoàng (director); Đào Phương Liên, Nguyễn Huy Hoàng (writers); Linh Nga, Quang Ánh, Tuấn Anh, Huyền Trang, Bình Xuyên, Kim Hoàn, Diệu Hương, Khắc Trịnh, Bích Huyền, Nguyễn Quang, Bắc Việt, Trần Toàn, Đức Trung, Hồ Việt, Bùi Tiềm...	Giây phút bình yên (Peaceful Moment) by Quỳnh Hoa	Drama, Crime	Adapted from novel of the same name by Nguyễn Đức Huệ
9 Sep-11 Nov	Muối mặn gừng cay... (Salty Salt, Spicy Ginger)	10 (70′)	Giải Phóng Film	Lê Ngọc Linh (director & writer); Thu Hương, Ngọc Thảo, Hùng Khanh, Thúy Hằng, Từ Minh Hiệp, Hồng Phượng, Lê Quốc Tân, Diễm Hằng, Quang Mẫn, Khương Thịnh, Kiều Trinh...		Drama, Rural	
18-25 Nov	Cõi thiêng của Huyền (Sacred Realm of Huyền)	2		Nguyễn Quang (director); Phạm Việt Long, Lê Công Hội (writers); Ánh Hồng, Thanh Chi, Lưu Minh Hoàng, Vân Anh, Hoàng Mai, Minh Tuấn, Xuân Tản, Bình Xuyên, Thế Bình, Văn Phong, Minh Trang, Xuân Hòa, Trung Thành, Hữu Hiếu, Đức Tiến, Lê Vũ...	Gia đình thiêng liêng (Spiritual Family) by Việt Hoàn	Drama, Marriage, Family	
2-30 Dec	Bông hồng trà (Camellia)	5	VFS	Trần Ngọc Phong (director); Nguyễn Hoàng, Nguyễn Huỳnh, Thúy An, Xuân Thùy, Hồng Giang, Minh Khoa, Nguyễn Sơn, Minh Hoàng, Lệ Thắm, Thanh Trúc, Minh Sáng, Huy Cường, Quách Tình, Hải Lý, Thiên Quỳnh, Nguyễn Vương, Thanh Sứ, Anh Nhàn, Hữu Dũng, Thế Mỹ, Hồng Ngọc, Quoanh Dy, Kim Loan, Lệ Hằng, Duy Nguyễn, Trung Quân, Trí Phương, Thế Tùng...	Honou no GO FIGHT by Tomoko Tokugaki	Drama, Post-war, Romance	

== VTV3 Sunday Literature & Art dramas ==
These dramas air in early Sunday afternoon on VTV3 as a part of the program Sunday Literature & Art (Vietnamese: Văn nghệ Chủ Nhật).

Broadcast	Title	Eps.	Prod.	Cast and crew	Theme song(s)	Genre	Notes
9 Apr	Một lần đi bụi (A Wandering Time)	1 (105′)	VFC	Trần Quốc Trọng (director); Trần Hoài Văn (writer); Trọng Khôi, Phương Khanh, Văn Anh, Nguyễn Kiều Anh, Minh Nguyệt, Quang Lâm, Công Dũng, Hữu Độ, Phú Thăng, Văn Cường, Công Tùng, Phạm Quân, Hữu Trí...		Adventure, Drama, Romance	Adapted from short story of the same name by Trần Hoài Văn
16 Apr	7 ngày và 1 đời (Seven Days and the Whole Life)	1	VFC	Đỗ Đức Thành (director); Nguyễn Thị Thu Huệ (writer); Mạnh Cường, Kiều Thanh, Khánh Huyền, Tiến Quang, Thùy Dung, Đào Văn Bích, Mỹ Linh, Hương Thảo, Huy Diễn, Bạch Tuyết, Ngọc Thịnh, Lê Thi, Anh Huy, Quang Tiệp, Anh Sơn, Phương Thanh, Thúy Hà, Mạnh Hà, Ngọc Linh, Bích Thủy, Văn Tạo, Kim Thoa, Quý Hải...	GO! GO! Rescue by JAM Project W - Infinity by Hironobu Kageyama and Hitomi Mieno	Romance, Drama	
23 Apr-9 Jul	Đèn vàng (Yellow Light)	12 (65′)	VFC	Mai Hồng Phong (director); Thùy Linh, Trần Hoài Văn (writers); Phạm Cường, Lê Vi, Thu Quế, Đức Khuê, Trọng Khôi, Trần Tiến, Lê Mai, Chu Văn Thức, Hà Văn Trọng, Hải Anh, Đàm Hằng, Vi Cầm, Phương Minh, Hồ Liên, Mỹ Hương, Mai Ngọc Căn, Minh Quốc, Đào Hùng, Ngọc Quang, Phương Thanh, Thanh Hiền...	'Đèn vàng' theme song by Thanh Thanh Hiền	Drama, Political, Business	Adapted from novel of the same name by Trần Chiến
16 Jul-1 Oct	Gió mùa thổi mãi (Unceasing Monsoon)	12 (70′)	VFC	Trần Quốc Trọng (director); Đặng Minh Châu (writer); Khánh Huyền, Văn Anh, Trịnh Nhật, Mỹ Duyên, Dũng Nhi, Thúy Hà, Hồng Sơn, Huyền Thanh, Hồng Quang, Mỹ Hạnh, Tuấn Phong, Mai Khanh, Tiến Đạt, Thanh Huệ, Đan Thơ, Ngọc Thu, Đức Trung, Diễm Lộc, Bạch Diện, Thu An, Phương Khanh, Trần Thụ, Quang Lâm, Tam Dương...	'Gió mùa thổi mãi' theme song by Xuân Hảo	Drama, Romance	
8 Oct 2006- 28 Jan 2007	Gió đại ngàn (Mountain Wind)	17 (65′)	VFC	Đỗ Chí Hướng (director); Nguyễn Ngọc Đức (writer); Minh Hòa, Hoàng Thắng, Kiều Minh Hiếu, Đỗ Kỷ, Mai Ngọc Căn, Lê Minh Tuấn, Huệ Đàn, Nguyệt Hằng, Duy Thanh, Khôi Nguyên, Nguyễn Kiều Anh, Dương Đức Quang, Bình Xuyên, Đặng Cao Cường, Trần Vân Anh, Hoàng Huy, Nguyễn Thu Hương, Linh Huệ, Cao Xuân Dương, Thu Hiền, Bảo Nam, Võ Thùy Ngọc, Tuấn Thịnh, Thái Hòa, Ngọc Tản, Thủy Phương, Quyết Chiến, Trần Ngọc Tiến...	'Gió đại ngàn' theme song Composed by Vũ Thảo	Crime, Drama, Ethnic	a.k.a Khi đàn chim trở về 2 (When the Birds Return 2)

== See also ==
- List of dramas broadcast by Vietnam Television (VTV)
- List of dramas broadcast by Hanoi Radio Television (HanoiTV)
- List of dramas broadcast by Vietnam Digital Television (VTC)
