= List of VTV dramas broadcast in 2012 =

This is a list of VTV dramas released in 2012.

←2011 - 2012 - 2013→

== VTV Special Tet dramas ==
These are short dramas airs on VTV1 during Tet Holiday.

| Broadcast | Title | Eps. | Prod. | Cast and crew | Theme song(s) | Genre | Notes |
|---|---|---|---|---|---|---|---|
| 22-27 Jan | Tìm nơi đón Tết (Where to Welcome Tet) | 6 | VFC | Trịnh Lê Phong (director); Như Quỳnh, Quang Thắng, Kim Oanh, Viết Thái, Lương Giang, Cường Việt, Tạ Am, Hải Anh, Joe Rueller... | 'Tìm nơi đón Tết' theme song | Comedy, Family | Airs from 11:00 to 11:45, 29th-5th Tet holiday |
| 23-27 Jan | Tết siêu tiết kiệm ('Super Saving' Tet) | 5 | VTV and TVPlus | Nguyễn Mạnh Hà (director); Hoàng Anh (writer); Tiến Đạt, Như Quỳnh, Anh Quân, Phan Minh Huyền, Chí Trung, Phú Đôn, Bùi Bài Bình, Thu Huyền, Quốc Quân, Thanh Tú, Ngọc Thoa, Văn Toàn, Thanh Thủy, Thanh Hương... | Xuân mộng mơ (Dreaming Spring) by Mộng Thường & Trung Kiên | Comedy, Family | Airs from 20:00 to 20:45, 1st to 5th Tet holiday |

== VTV1 Weeknight Prime-time dramas ==
=== Monday-Wednesday dramas ===
These dramas air from 20:05 to 20:50, Monday to Wednesday on VTV1.

| Broadcast | Title | Eps. | Prod. | Cast and crew | Theme song(s) | Genre | Notes |
|---|---|---|---|---|---|---|---|
| 18 Apr-23 Jul | Đàn trời (The Empyrean Tunes) | 36 | VFC | Bùi Huy Thuần (director); Phạm Ngọc Tiến (adapter); Hoàng Dũng, Trung Anh, Anh Tú, Kiều Thanh, Tùng Dương, Lệ Thu, Sỹ Tiến, Tiến Mộc, Diệu Thuần, Dũng Nhi, Thanh Tùng, Hồng Chương, Phú Thăng, Thi Nhung, Văn Báu, Dương Đức Quang, Khuất Quỳnh Hoa, Trí Hiếu, Hải Yến, Quốc Quân, Vũ Hải, Anh Dũng, Thanh Hiền... | Đàn trời (The Empyrean Tunes) by Tiến Dũng | Political, Drama, Crime | Adapted from the novel of the same name by Cao Duy Sơn |
| 30 Jul-10 Dec | Lạc mất linh hồn (Losing Soul) | 55 | VnFilm | Lê Minh (director); Hồng Vân, Anh Dũng, Quỳnh Trang (writers); Thanh Điền, Minh Phương, Quốc Cường, Trịnh Kim Chi, Đoàn Thanh Tài, Đinh Y Nhung, Hoài Ân, Kim Hiền, Hoàng Anh, Nhã Phương, Kiều Chinh... | Lạc mất linh hồn (Losing Soul) by Hiền Thục | Drama | |
| 11 Dec 2012- 5 Mar 2013 | Ông tơ hai phẩy ("Mr. Matchmaker") | 30 | VTV and TVPlus | Nguyễn Danh Dũng (director); Hà Anh Thu, Phùng Chí Cương, Tống Phương Dung, Trần Thanh Hồng (writers); Trung Hiếu, Vi Cầm, Lan Hương 'Bông', Tiến Đạt, Nguyễn Thu Hà, Phú Đôn, Hồng Lê, Viết Thái, Việt Bắc, Như Quỳnh, Trọng Trinh, Minh Châu, Nguyệt Hằng, Việt Anh, Phan Minh Huyền... | Hạnh phúc (Happiness) by Nhật Thủy | Marriage, Comedy, Romance | Airs 20:30 to 21:20 since 2013 |

=== Thursday-Friday dramas ===
These dramas air from 20:05 to 20:50, Thursday and Friday on VTV1.

| Broadcast | Title | Eps. | Prod. | Cast and crew | Theme song(s) | Genre | Notes |
|---|---|---|---|---|---|---|---|
| 8 Mar-15 Jun | Qua ngày giông bão (Crossing Stormy Day) | 26 | VFC | Đỗ Chí Hướng (director); Lê Phương Anh (writer); Thiện Tùng, Thùy Dương, Ngọc Quỳnh, Thái Hòa, Mai Ngọc Căn, Xuân Đồng, Phương Hạnh, Đam San, Bình Xuyên, Thanh Huyền, Công Vượng, Ngọc Tản, Huyền Trang, Minh Tuấn, Huy Bách, Mai Duyên, Quỳnh Trang, Thanh Hà, Việt Nga, Kim Thanh, Tuấn Dương, Thu Hương, Sĩ Hoài, Đinh Hồng Sơn, Mậu Hòa, Thùy Dung... | 'Qua ngày giông bão' theme song | Rural, Political, Romance | |
| 22 Jun-2 Nov | Những công dân tập thể (Residents in the Tenement) | 36 | VFC | Vũ Trường Khoa, Trần Quang Vinh (directors); Đặng Diệu Hương (writer); Như Quỳnh, Kiều Anh, Công Dũng, Trung Anh, Minh Hằng, Quốc Trị, Lan Hương 'Bông', Quốc Trọng, Văn Sang, Diễm Hương, Phùng Khánh Linh, Hồ Phong, Sơn Tùng, Khuất Quỳnh Hoa, Đào Hoàng Yến, Trọng Trinh, Bình Trọng, Thu Huyền, Thanh Chi, Linh Chi, Ngọc Bích, Thanh Hiền, Mạnh Cường, Yến My, Thanh Nhàn, Hải Yến, Thanh Nhàn, Huyền Trang, Diệp Bích... | Khu nhà cũ (The Old House); Opening Version by Đinh Tiến Dũng & Dương Hoàng Yến; Ending Version by Dương Hoàng Yến | Drama | |
| 8 Nov 2012- 15 Mar 2013 | Hai phía chân trời (Two Sides of Horizon) | 36 | VFC | Trần Quốc Trọng, Vũ Trường Khoa (director); Trần Hoài Sơn (writer); Mạnh Cường, Lê Vũ Long, Xuân Bắc, Kiều Thanh, Kiều Anh, Vi Cầm, Lê Vy, Diamen Odess Gillet, Lâm Vissay, Quỳnh Hoa, Irina Zabrodina Jorgensen, Giang Thanh, Tatiana Evonuk, Andrea Aybar, Ngọc Thoa, Minh Châu, Quốc Trị... | Đường xa tuyết trắng (Long Road Among White Snow) by Tùng Dương | Drama | Adapted from the story of 'Máu của tuyết' by Trần Hoài Sơn. Filming in Vietnam and Czech Republic. |

== VTV3 Weeknight Prime-time dramas ==
=== Monday-Wednesday dramas ===
These dramas air from 21:30 to 22:20, Monday to Wednesday on VTV3.

| Broadcast | Title | Eps. | Prod. | Cast and crew | Theme song(s) | Genre | Notes |
|---|---|---|---|---|---|---|---|
| 5 Mar-23 May | Hoa nắng (Sunny Flower) | 36 | Galaxy Studio | Đặng Minh Quang (director); Đặng Thanh, Huyền Anh, Anh Thụy (writers); Trịnh Kim Chi, Hữu Phước, Thanh Điền, Tuyết Thư, Quang Khải, Nhã Phương, Lê Bê La, Kha Ly, Hà Trí Quang, Hoàng Anh, Tấn Phát, Huy Cường, Anh Đào, Trịnh Phương Đài, Tống Mỹ Ly, Bảo Khương, Hồng Thắm, Phương Dung, Thanh Vy... | Tình yêu rực nắng (Blazing Love) by Bảo Phương | Drama | |
| 28 May-1 Aug | Cạm bẫy (Pitfalls) | 30 | M&T Pictures | Hồng Phú Vinh (director); Bích Huyền, Thùy Trang, Huy Khánh, Lâm Minh Thắng, Lê Trang, Đoàn Thanh Tài, Nguyễn Hậu, Hữu Luận, Nguyễn Hậu, Nguyễn Sanh, Kiều Trinh, Lê Thi... | Cạm bẫy cuộc đời (Life's Pitfalls) by Như Ý Hãy cứ yên vui (Keep Staying in Peace and Happiness) by Lương Thế Minh | Drama | |
| 6 Aug-10 Oct | Mình cưới thật em nhé (Marry Me, OK?) | 30 | V-Art Films | Xuân Phước (director); Vân Anh, Trần Yến, Lê Phương (writers); Diệp Bảo Ngọc, Lương Thế Thành, Minh Nguyệt, Hoàng Sơn, Nguyễn Sanh, Cung Phong, Thanh Bình, Bích Hằng, Hải Lý, Thanh Tùng, Thủy Cúc, Mai Phượng, Vang Quốc Hải, Mai Thế Hiệp, Quách Hữu Lộc, Võ Minh Bảo, Lê Nam, Thụy Mười, Phi Bảo, Nam Trung, Hà Vỹ Thanh.. | 'Mình cưới thật em nhé' theme songs 1, 2, 3 | Drama, Romance | |
| 15 Oct 2012- 2 Jan 2013 | Giấc mơ cỏ may (The Dream of Lovegrass) | 36 | VietCom Film | Nguyễn Dương (director); Dương Nhật Vi, Trấn Thành, Bình Minh, Tinna Tình, Thu Tuyết, Quốc Thuận, Minh Nhí, Trịnh Kim Chi, Hoài An, Đình Hiếu, Hùng Thuận, Thanh Điền... | Giấc mơ cỏ may (The Dream of Lovegrass) by Minh Đăng | Drama | |

=== Thursday-Friday dramas ===
These dramas air from 21:30 to 22:20, Thursday and Friday on VTV3.

| Broadcast | Title | Eps. | Prod. | Cast and crew | Theme song(s) | Genre | Notes |
|---|---|---|---|---|---|---|---|
| 6 Jul-29 Nov | Mặt nạ da người (Masks) | 42 | VFC | Mai Hồng Phong (director); Nguyễn Xuân Trường (writer); Như Quỳnh, Phạm Cường, Minh Hà, Hồng Quang, Tuấn Tú, Đậu Thị Hồng Phúc, Hải Anh, Đồng Thanh Bình, Thu Hà, Minh Hương, Trịnh Xuân Hảo, Trương Ngọc Phú, Hồng Đức, Huyền Thanh, Trương Việt Thường, Diệp Bích, Đào Hoàng Yến, Bình Xuyên, Vũ Thủy, Thùy Linh, Hải Hà, Sỹ Lai, Huyền Trang, Lê Ngọc Quang, Lê Kiều... | Bến đời (Life Dock) by Mỹ Linh | Drama, Political, Crime | |
| 30 Nov 2012- 8 Mar 2013 | Ba đám cưới - Một đời chồng (Three Weddings, One Husband) | 27 | VFC | Nguyễn Khải Anh (director); Thanh Hồng, Xuân Trường (writers); Đan Lê, Danh Tùng, Lưu Đê Ly, Thanh Huyền, Việt Bắc, Hoàng Linh, Phan Minh Huyền, Đàm Hoàng, Lan Hương 'Bông', Phú Thăng, Viết Liên, Model Anh Tuấn... | Ký ức ngủ quên (Sleeping Memory) by Bích Phương; Đến bên em (Come Beside Me) by Trang Pháp | Drama, Romance | |

== VTV3 Rubic 8 dramas ==
These dramas air from 14:30 to 15:15 (15:00 to 15:50 since Duyên nghiệp), Saturday and Sunday on VTV3 as a part of the program Rubic 8.

| Broadcast | Title | Eps. | Prod. | Cast and crew | Theme song(s) | Genre | Notes |
|---|---|---|---|---|---|---|---|
| 17 Mar-22 Jul | Chân trời trắng (White Horizon) | 38 | VFC | Phạm Gia Phương, Nguyễn Đức Hiếu (director); Phạm Cao Toại, Phạm Thanh Phong, Nguyễn Thu Phong, Nguyễn Thu Hằng (writers); Diệp Anh, Thu Huyền, Mạnh Trường, Minh Phương, Khánh Chi, Việt Anh, Kim Oanh, Trung Anh, Trần Nhượng, Kim Ngọc, Hoàng Anh Vũ, Công Chí, Hoàng Minh, Thanh Hương, Thúy Hiền, Khương Đức Thuận, Thúy Hà, Tiến Minh... | Đừng nói yêu em mãi (Don't Say Love Me Forever) by Nhật Thủy | Medical, Drama, Romance, Crime | |
| 28 Jul-4 Nov | Đôi cánh đồng tiền (Wings of Money) | 30 | Galaxy Studio | Nguyễn Minh Cao (director); Gió Phương Nam (writer); Phương Hằng, Võ Thanh Hòa, Duy Phước, Văn Anh Duy, Vy Minh, Thanh Vy, Hoài An, Công Ninh, Phương Dung, Hoàng Thanh, Mai Sơn, Mỹ Dung, Hồng Thắm, Bảo Chung, Đình Hiếu, Minh Thảo, Ngọc Hạnh, Hữu Thành, Thụy Mười... | Đôi cánh đồng tiền (Wings of Money) & Cảm ơn em đã thứ tha (Thank You For Forgiving Me) by Nguyễn Minh Anh | Drama | |
| 10-11 Nov | Giới hạn cuối cùng (The Final Limit) | 2 | VFC | Đỗ Gia Chung (director); Phạm Thanh Ngà (writer); Trần Hạnh, Ngọc Dung, Thúy Hà, Xuân Trường, Viết Thái, Nguyễn Thu Hà, Thu Phương, Thúy Hiền... | ...đã quên (...forgot) by Dương Hoàng Yến | Drama | Adapted from the story of 'Mua nhà' by Nguyễn Huy Hoàng |
| 17 Nov 2012- 24 Feb 2013 | Duyên nghiệp (The Fate of Career) | 30 | Galaxy Studio | Vũ Thái Hòa (director); Minh Anh (writer); Lê Bửu Đa, Phùng Ngọc Huy, Diễm Trang, Xuân Hiệp, Cao Mỹ Kim, Mai Trần, Lân Bích, Minh Đức, Huỳnh Thiên, Hải Hùng, Minh Cảnh, Diệu Nhi, Anh Duy, Bảo Trí... | Thổi sắc cho mây (Blowing Colours into the Clouds) by Viết Thanh | Drama | |

== VTV6 Lemon Tea dramas ==
New time slot called Lemon Tea (Vietnamese: Trà chanh) was opened this year towards young audiences.

These dramas air from 19:15 to 20:00, Saturday and Sunday on VTV6.

| Broadcast | Title | Eps. | Prod. | Cast and crew | Theme song(s) | Genre | Notes |
|---|---|---|---|---|---|---|---|
| 7 Jul-24 Nov | Làn môi trong mưa (Lips in the Rain) | 36 | VFC | Đỗ Đức Thịnh (director & writer); Thanh Thúy, Văn Anh, Diễm My, Thái Hòa, Cao Minh Đạt, Lan Phương, Diệu Đức, Minh Luân, Cao Mỹ Kim, Hữu Luân, Đỗ Đức Thịnh, Công Ninh, Huỳnh Anh Tuấn... | Cô gái đến từ hôm qua (The Girl From Yesterday) by Mỹ Tâm; Tình yêu mãi mãi (Forever Love) by Mỹ Kim | Romance, Comedy, Drama | Inspired by the character 'Hằng" from story of 'Làn môi đồng trinh' by Võ Thị Hảo |
| 8 Dec 2012- 6 Jan 2013 | Về nơi bình yên (To a Peaceful Place) | 8 | VFC | Đỗ Chí Hướng (director); Mạnh Cường, Ngân Hà (writers); Mỹ Hạnh, Chí Dương, Huyền Trang, Ninh Trang, Thu Hà, Lê Quốc Thắng, Thu Huyền, Khánh Linh, Thu Hương, Chí Công, Đỗ Duy Nam, Kim Ngân, Hải Anh, Thái Hòa, Trọng Hùng, Văn Triệu, Thu Hương, Kim Liên, Kim Ngọc... | Hoa nắng bên anh (Sunny Flower Beside You) by Thùy Chi | Drama | |

== See also ==
- List of dramas broadcast by Vietnam Television (VTV)
- List of dramas broadcast by Hanoi Radio Television (HanoiTV)
- List of dramas broadcast by Vietnam Digital Television (VTC)
