= List of VTV dramas broadcast in 2003 =

This is a list of VTV dramas released in 2003.

←2002 - 2003 - 2004→

== VTV New Year dramas ==
This film airs from 21:00 to 22:30 on VTV1 in the occasion of New Year 2003.

Broadcast	Title	Eps.	Prod.	Cast and crew	Theme song(s)	Genre	Notes
1 Jan	Xuân Cồ: Nhà hòa giải (Xuân Cồ the Peacemaker)	1 (80′)	VTV Film Prod.	Vũ Minh Trí (director); Khuất Quang Thụy (writer); Phú Đôn, Hồ Liên, Công Lý, Mỹ Linh, Tạ Am, Anh Quân, Thái Duy, Tam Anh, Thu Hường, Thu Trang, Thanh Huyền, Anh Tú, Ba Duy, Nguyễn Thụ, Huyền Thanh, Thương Huyền...		Comedy, Sport	A part of Xuân Cồ the series

== VTV Tet dramas ==
These films air on VTV channels during Tet holiday.

=== VTV1 ===
Broadcast	Title	Eps.	Prod.	Cast and crew	Theme song(s)	Genre	Notes
31 Jan	Tin lành tháng Chạp (Good News For Year-End)	1	VTV Film Prod.	Nguyễn Danh Dũng (director); Khuất Quang Thụy (writer); Đức Khuê, Trần Hạnh, Thu Hương, Bá Cường, Công Lý...		Comedy, Drama, Political	Airs 10:00, 29th Tet holiday
1 Feb	Người trong vở diễn xưa (That Year, That Play, That One)	1 (75′)	VTV Film Prod.	Mạc Văn Chung (director); Lê Công Hội (writer); Ngọc Dung, Hạnh Đạt, Thành An, Thế Bình, Thanh Tùng, Trịnh Mai Nguyên, Vũ Tăng, Ngọc Trung, Huyền Thanh, Ngọc Ánh, Thùy Dung, Thanh Loan...		Drama	Airs 13:00, 1st Tet holiday.
3 Feb	Tìm mẹ (Finding Mommy)	1 (72′)	VTV Film Prod.	Vũ Minh Trí (director); Trần Đan Linh (writer); Đức Khuê, Mỹ Huyền, Minh Hằng, Thu Quế, Công Lý, Quang Thắng...	'Tìm mẹ' theme song	Family, Drama, Romance	Airs 21:00, 3rd Tet holiday

=== VTV3 ===
Broadcast	Title	Eps.	Prod.	Cast and crew	Theme song(s)	Genre	Notes
31 Jan	Lão hà tiện vui tính (Funny Miser Man)	1 (80′)	VTV Film Prod.	Vũ Hồng Sơn (director); Phạm Văn Khôi (writer); Trần Quốc Trọng, Thu Hạnh, Lệ Hằng, Vi Cầm, Sỹ Tiến, Tăng Nhật Tuệ, Tuyết Liên, Thành An, Tạ Am, Trần Thụ, Tuấn Anh, Thu Phương, Mậu Hòa, Phương Thanh...		Comedy, Family	Airs 08:30, 29th Tet holiday.
1 Feb	Về quê ăn Tết (Have Yourself a Real Country Tet)	1 (75′)	VTV Film Prod.	Nguyễn Hữu Phần (director); Nguyễn Diệu Trang (writer); Hồng Chương, Ngọc Thoa, Duy Thanh, Thanh Hiền, Kim Hoàn...		Family, Comedy, Drama	Airs 09:00, 1st Tet holiday
1 Feb	Ôi bánh dầy (They Again!)	1	VTV Film Prod.	Đỗ Chí Hướng (director); Lương Đình Dũng (writer); Nam Cường, Văn Hiệp, Như Lai, Thanh Nhàn, Ngọc Dương, Văn Vượng, Hữu Hồng, Ngọc Loan, Bùi Vân, Xuân Phương, Thu Hương, Ngọc Tản...		Rural, Comedy, Drama	Airs 15:10, 1st Tet holiday
2 Feb	Chuyện như đùa (Like a Joke)	1 (75′)	VTV Film Prod.	Vũ Trường Khoa (director); Nguyễn Thị Thu Huệ (writer); Trung Hiếu, Kim Oanh, Quốc Việt, Bình Trọng, Đức Hùng, Thùy Dương, Thu Huyền, Mỹ Duyên, Hương Chanh, Xuân Kiên...		Comedy, Romance	Airs 08:10, 2nd Tet holiday
2 Feb	Súc sắc súc sẻ (Dicey Dice)	1 (90′)	VTV Film Prod.	Trần Hoài Sơn (director); Phạm Trung Ngọc Linh (writer); Công Lý, Hồng Giang, Ngọc Thư...		Drama, Marriage	Airs 20:30, 2nd Tet holiday
3 Feb	To nhất làng (Biggest in Town)	1 (90′)	VTV Film Prod.	Nguyễn Anh Tuấn (director); Nguyễn Yên Thế (writer); Nguyễn Mỹ Trang, Tuấn Anh, Trần Thụ, Nguyễn Huấn, Thế Bình, Văn Hòa, Quang Thiện, Thanh Am, Huyền Thanh, Phương Lâm, Thúy Cải, Thu Hường, Tuyết Liên, Quang Đại, Văn Đáng, Thanh Bình, Đức Hoài, Nguyễn Quân...		Comedy, Romance, Family, Rural	Airs 08:10, 3rd Tet holiday

== VTV1 Monday night - Weeknight Vietnamese dramas ==
- Note: Unlisted airtime periods were spent for special events.

=== VTV1 Monday night dramas ===
Following up the time slot in previous years, these dramas air in every Monday night from 21:00 to 22:00 on VTV1.

Broadcast	Title	Eps.	Prod.	Cast and crew	Theme song(s)	Genre	Notes
13 Jan-3 Mar	Đất lành (Pacificatory Land)	7	VTV Film Prod.	Mai Hồng Phong (director); Đặng Minh Châu (writer); Lê Vi, Quốc Tuấn, Đức Sơn, Như Cầm, Anh Trâm, Bích Huyền, Nguyễn Hoàng, Ngọc Chi, Quốc Bảo...		Drama	Delay 1 ep on 3 Feb
16 Feb-23 Mar	Dưới mái hiên (Under the Porch)	4	TĐN	Lê Ngọc Linh (director); Vĩnh Quyền (writer)		Drama	
7-21 Apr	Lễ mừng thọ (Longevity Ceremony)	4	VTV Film Prod.	Triệu Tuấn (director); Nguyễn Thiện Kế (writer); Trần Hạnh, Minh Nguyệt, Hồ Tháp, Kim Oanh, Phương Toàn, Trịnh Thái, Lệ Hằng, Huệ Đàn, Minh Tâm, Anh Quân, Quốc Quân, Bình Trọng, Hoàng Linh, Lưu Mỹ Linh, Mạnh Tuấn...		Family, Drama	Ep 3-4 air back-to-back on 21 Apr
28-30 Apr	Ấp ba nhà (Three-houses Village)	3 (75′)	VTV and KGTV	Trần Vịnh (director); Nguyễn Mạnh Tuấn (writer); Trần Thị Chính, Thành An, Cẩm Nhung, Lâm Tấn Phát, Mã Đức, Mai Khi, Bá Thi, Tố Nguyên, Hồng Cẩm, Tuyết Hoa, Minh Tâm, Bá Ước, Tuấn Ngọc, Trung Dũng, Thanh Hồng, Tài Thu, Quyết Thắng, Hoàng Vân, Trí Vinh, Khánh Vinh, Trần Quỳnh, Quang Nhật, Thế Long, Ba Liên, Văn Trưởng, Tám Dũng, Trường Long, Xuân Thành, Hữu Nam, Khắc Trường, Thủy Hoàng...	Ấp ba nhà (Three-houses Village) by Hà Vi	Historical, War, Drama	Airs 3 days in a row in the occasion of Reunification Day Celebration. Adapted from short story of the same name by Lê Vĩnh Hòa.
5-19 May	Tình yêu của tôi (Love of Mine)	3	VTV Film Prod.	Bùi Huy Thuần (director); Nguyễn Thị Minh Hồng (writer); Bích Ngọc, Minh Tiệp, Thu Trang, Anh Dũng, Thanh Vân, Huyền Thanh, Trần Thụ, Phương Khanh, Phạm Hồng Minh...		Drama, Romance	
26 May-28 Jul	Đối mặt (Face Off)	10	VTV Film Prod.	Trần Vịnh (director); Xuân Đức (writer); Ngọc Thủy, Tạ Nghi Lễ, Ngọc Thiện, Thế Hùng, Thương Huyền, Văn Long, Nam Trung, Thế Tuệ, Thành Tuấn, Thanh Nhàn, Quang Hà, Hoàng Giang, Nguyễn Tam, Thanh Tâm, Trọng Thanh, Đông Nguyên, Thu Hằng, Lê Bình, Thu Lưỡng, Quang Lữ, Xuân Vũ, Thanh Hạp, Linh Thủy, Hoàng Thi, Hữu Thiện, Nguyễn Sơn...	'Đối mặt' theme song by VOV's orchestra & choir members	Drama, War	
4 Aug-1 Sep	Lời thề Đất Mũi (The Oath in Cape Land)	Ep 1 to Ep 5	VTV and CTV	Trần Văn Hưng (director); Nguyễn Bá, Nguyễn Khắc Phục (writers); Hứa Vĩ Văn, Tấn Thành, Quyền Linh, Lý Thanh Thảo, Nguyệt Nhi, Lý Hùng, Hoài Anh, Minh Hoàng, Nhật Kim Anh...	Lời thề Đất Mũi (The Oath in Cape Land) by Hoa Phượng	Historical, Drama, War	
8-15 Sep	Followed by the playback of Phong lan đỏ (Red Orchid), 2 episodes. The drama was first released on HTV7 channel in 1997.						
22 Sep-13 Oct	Followed by the playback of Cô thư ký xinh đẹp (The Beautiful Secretary), 4 episodes. The drama was first released on HTV9 channel in 2000.						

=== VTV1 Weeknight dramas ===
Since 20 October, the VTV1 night drama time slot (which comprises Monday night time slot for Vietnamese dramas and Tuesday to Friday night time slot for foreign dramas) was split in two lines airing from Monday to Friday: 21:00 to 22:00 for Vietnamese dramas and 22:00 to 23:00 for foreign dramas.

- Note: Since 1 August, Vietnam Television Film Production (Vietnamese: Hãng phim truyền hình Việt Nam) has been converted to Vietnam Television Film Center with the short form VFC (Vietnamese: Trung tâm sản xuất phim truyền hình Việt Nam or Trung tâm sản xuất phim truyền hình - Đài truyền hình Việt Nam).

Broadcast	Title	Eps.	Prod.	Cast and crew	Theme song(s)	Genre	Notes
20 Oct-24 Nov	Started with the playback of Dòng đời (Life Line), 52 episodes, 2 episodes per night. The drama was first released on HTV9 channel in 2001.						
25 Nov-2 Dec	Gió thổi qua rừng (The Wind Blew Through The Woods)	7	VFC	Triệu Tuấn (director); Nguyễn Hữu Nhàn (writer); Trần Hạnh, Minh Nguyệt, Hải Anh, Lan Anh, Xuân Hương, Thùy Liên, Mạnh Kiểm, Văn Hồng, Trần Quỳnh, Bình Trọng, Trần Trung...		Drama, Ethnic	Based on short story of the same name by Nguyễn Hữu Nhàn
4 Dec	SEA Games của Xuân Cồ (Xuân Cồ's SEA Games)	1	VFC	Vũ Minh Trí (director); Khuất Quang Thụy (writer); Phú Đôn, Công Lý...		Comedy	Produced in the occasion of 22nd SEA Games
8-15 Dec	Followed by the playback of Những năm tháng đã qua (The Years That Passed), 5 episodes. The drama was first released on HTV7 channel in 1997. *Note: Delayed 2 episodes on 9 & 11 Dec.						
16-19 Dec	Followed by the playback of Những ngày vẫn có mặt trời (Days With Sun Still Above), 4 episodes. The drama was first released on VTV1 channel in 2002.						
22-26 Dec	Những người lính biển (Marine Soldiers)	7	VTV Center in HCMC (Note: Vietnamese: Trung tâm truyền hình Việt Nam tại thành phố Hồ Chí Minh; present-day VTV Center in Southern Vietnam (Vietnamese: Trung tâm truyền hình Việt Nam khu vực Nam Bộ))	Trần Vịnh (director); Đình Kính (writer); Trần Vịnh, Trần Tú, Quang Ánh, Anh Hoài, Xuân Thảo, Đỗ Quyên, Mạnh Khiêm, Trần Tường, Văn Báu, Nam Cường, Bắc Việt, Quang Long, Văn Quyến, Phương Mai, Thúy Vy, Văn Thiện, Quang Hưng, Bích Ngọc, Văn Ngọc, Bằng Linh, Văn Như, Đại Nghĩa, Cố Trung, Đình Hồng, Ngọc Bảo, Cảnh Trà, Hải Khoa, Thu Hường...	'Những người lính biển' opening song 'Những người lính biến' ending song by VOV's orchestra & choir members	Historical, War, Action, Drama	Produced to celebrate National People's Army Day
29 Dec 2003- 4 Feb 2004	Followed by the playback of Đất và người (The Land and the People), 24 episodes. The drama was first released on VTV1 channel in 2002. *Note: Delayed 1 episode on 30 Dec.						

== VTV3 Cinema For Saturday Afternoon dramas ==
These dramas air in early Saturday afternoon on VTV3 with the duration approximately 70 minutes as a part of the program Cinema for Saturday afternoon (Vietnamese: Điện ảnh chiều thứ Bảy).

Broadcast	Title	Eps.	Prod.	Cast and crew	Theme song(s)	Genre	Notes
18 Jan	Đứa con (The Daughter)	1		Đào Duy Phúc (director); Nguyễn Xuân Thành (writer); Diệp Anh, Thu Quế, Sỹ Tiến, Chu Đình Linh, Bích Thủy, Chiến Sơn, Hồ Lan, Quý Bản, Đức Long, Lan Minh, Mạnh Hà, Nguyễn Thu Hà, Nhật Lệ, Thu Hiền, Khải Hà...		Drama, Family, Slice-of-Life	Adapted from short story of the same name by Lưu Quang Vũ
25-31 Jan	Chuyện xảy ra trước Tết (It Happened Before Tet)	2		Đào Duy Phúc, Nguyễn Mạnh Hà (directors); Lê Ngọc Minh, Nhị Linh (writers); Duy Thanh, Quang Thiện, Hạnh Đạt, Thanh Hiền, Hồng Chương, Vĩnh Xương, Trương Thu Hà, Trần Hạnh, Kim Thoa, Phương Thảo, Xuân Nam, Lâm Tùng, Thế Tục, Thúy Hà, Kiều Minh Hiếu, Mai Hương, Trịnh Mai Nguyên, Kim Thủy, Bình Trọng, Văn Chung...		Rural, Family, Comedy, Drama	Due to the broadcast schedule for Tet programs, the issue on Sat, 1 Feb was moved to Fri, 31 Jan
8-15 Feb	Em ở nơi nao (Where Are You?)	2		Nguyễn Long Khánh (writer); Phú Đôn, Trần Hạnh, Diệu Thuần, Việt Thắng, Đức Hiệp, Bích Ngọc, Thanh Tâm, Trần Tiệp...		Drama	
22 Feb-1 Mar	Ảo vọng xe hơi (Automobile Illusion)	2		Nguyễn Hữu Phần (director); Phạm Văn Khôi (writer); Diệu Thuần, Đình Chiến, Thành An, Quế Hằng, Đức Long, Phú Đôn, Ngọc Hân, Minh Tuấn, Nam Trung, Quang Ánh, Thượng An, Hồng Gấm, Văn Mỵ, Thế Tục, Lệ Thu, Lê Hiệp, Anh Quân, Thu Thủy...		Drama, Family	
8-15 Mar	Phía sau một vụ án (A Case)	2		Nguyễn Giang Minh (director); Nguyễn Vĩnh Anh, Giang Minh (writers); Minh Tuấn, Thanh Giang, Duy Đông, Bá Cường, Kim Hoàn...		Drama, Crime	
22 Mar-5 Apr	Kết thúc chỉ là sự khởi đầu (The End Is Just The Beginning)	3				Drama	
12 Apr-3 May	Nhật ký chiến trường (Battlefield Diary)	4		Nguyễn Thế Vinh (director); Nguyễn Thị Hồng Ngát (writer); Hà Văn Trọng, Diệu Thuần, Hồng Quang, Thúy Hà, Ngọc Hà, Đình Lương, Duy Anh, Hồng Thêu, Viết Liên, Trọng Hoàn, Ngọc Mỹ, Diệu Linh, Kiều Thanh, Hoàng Trung, Minh Đại, Văn Đức...		War, Drama	Adapted from the novel of 'Bê trọc' by Phạm Việt Long
10-17 May	Thuyền đời (Life Boat)	2		Cao Mạnh (director); Đào Duy Thép (writer)		Drama	
24-31 May	Phượng hồng (Pink Flamboyant)	2		Vũ Đình Thân (director); Lịch Du (writer); Trần Lan Trà My, Bùi Hà Miên, Duy Khoa, Mỹ Hạnh, Ngọc Mỹ, Quang Tuấn, Hoàng Mai, Kim Thoa, Văn Hợp, Khánh Thông, Minh Hằng, Đức Thuận, Kim Quý, Mỹ Liên...		Drama, Family, Romance, Slice-of-Life	Based on the novel of 'Đường đời' by Nguyễn Thị Việt Nga
7-14 Jun	Thức tỉnh (Awakening)	2		Nguyễn Thế Vinh (director); Nguyễn Xuân Hải (writer); Hữu Độ, Tuấn Quang, Hà Anh, Minh Đức, Thúy Tản, Xuân Bắc, Hồng Thêu, Thủy Linh, Trọng Hoàn, Trần Cương, Cao Hùng, Văn Thắng, Ánh Tuyết, Quang Hưng, Lệ Mỹ, Viết Thắng, Văn Hồng, Minh Thoa, Xuân Hải, Hồng Mây, Vân Anh, Văn Đức, Hạnh Ly, Hải Anh, Minh Hạnh, Thu Hương, Anh Tuấn...	Lupin III '79; Composed by Yuji Ohno, You & The Explosion Band	Drama, Crime	
21-28 Jun	Hoa và nước mắt (Flowers and Tears)	2		Võ Việt Hùng (director); Nguyễn Thị Mộng Nghĩa (writer); Minh Thư, Nguyễn Bá Lộc, Vũ Đắc, Lê Văn Dũng, Thu Hoa, Thiên Lộc, Nguyễn Thanh Vân...		Drama	
5 Jul	Lòng mẹ (Mother's Heart)	1		Nguyễn Hữu Luyện (director); Đàm Hằng...		Drama, Family	
12-26 Jul	Người thừa của dòng họ (The Odd One in the Family)	3		Nguyễn Hữu Trọng, Trịnh Lê Phong (directors); Lê Công Hội (writer); Quốc Tuấn, An Chinh, Kiều Oanh, Phạm Bằng, Trần Hạnh, Quốc Trị...		Rural, Drama, Marriage, Family	
2 Aug	Vào đời (Into Life)	1		Phạm Nhuệ Giang (director); Nguyễn Toàn Thắng (writer); Công Dũng, Kiều Anh...		Drama	
9-16 Aug	Niệm khúc cuối (The Last Song)	2		Nguyễn Anh Dũng (director); Nguyễn Thu Dung (writer); Trọng Khôi, Xuân Bắc, Hà Hương, Minh Trang, Trung Anh, Hồng Thoa, Thanh Tùng, Chu Thảo, Thanh Thúy, Hương Thúy...		Drama, Musical, Romance	
23 Aug-6 Sep	Thời gian sống (Lifetime)	3		Vũ Đình Thân (director); Trần Thế Thành (writer); Tiến Mộc, Hương Ly, Hiền Linh, Vũ Phan Anh...		Drama	
13 Sep	Món quà đến từ giấc mơ (A Gift From The Dream)	1		Nguyễn Mạnh Hà (director); Nguyễn Thị Minh Quyên (writer); Trung Anh, Vân Anh, Hải Anh, An Nguyên, Phương Minh, Phương Linh, Đình Chiến, Trương Thu Hà, Lâm Tùng, Hồ Liên, Hà Duy, Mạnh Hải, Vĩnh Xương, Thu Tản, Thu Hằng, Tăng Nhật Tuệ...		Drama, Family, Slice-of-Life	Adapted from short story 'Những con gấu bông' by Nguyễn Nhật Ánh
20 Sep-4 Oct	Dòng lũ cuốn (The Flood Stream)	3		Bùi Tuấn Dũng (director); Đặng Trung (writer); Hồng Quang, Ngọc Hà, Khôi Nguyên, Mai Hòa, Thanh Hằng, Thùy Trang, Mai Hương...		Drama, Marriage	Adapted from short story 'Làm vợ giữa dòng xoáy lũ' by Văn Ngô Quang
11-18 Oct	Cái chết của Hồ Xuân Hương (The Death of Hồ Xuân Hương)	2		Đoàn Lê (director & writer); Thu Hằng, Vũ Phan Anh, Minh Phong, Quang Long...		Drama, Romance, Period	
25 Oct-1 Nov	Tình người (Affection)	2		Vũ Đình Thân (director); Đào Phương Liên (writer); Nguyễn Chung, Thu Hằng, Hoa Thúy, Mai Hòa, Danh Thái, Vũ Phan Anh...		Drama	
8-15 Nov	Đảo chắn sóng (Breakwater Island)	2		Nguyễn Hữu Phần (director); Phạm Văn Khôi (writer)		Drama	
22 Nov	Bẫy người (Human Trap)	1		Cao Mạnh (director); Phạm Ngọc Tiến (writer); Thanh Hương, Thu Hương, Đăng Khoa, Hồng Giang, Hồ Liên, Thành An, Minh Đại...		Drama, Crime	
29 Nov-20 Dec	Lối về (Wayback)	2		Hoàng Thanh Du (director); Lương Sỹ Cầm (writer); Trung Anh, Mai Huyền, Phù Thăng, Ngân Hoa, Hoàng Thanh Du, Tuấn Minh, Hoa Thúy, Thanh Tùng, Lan Minh, Hà Xa, Xuân Cường...		Drama	Delay on 6 & 13 Dec due to the broadcast schedule for 22nd SEA Games
27 Dec	Xuân muộn (Late Spring)	1	VFC	Triệu Tuấn (director); Lương Xuân Thủy (writer); Hoa Thúy, Vũ Phan Anh, Uy Linh, Đàm Hằng, Ngọc Vân, Hồng Thêu, Hải Anh, Anh Phương, Minh Châu, Thiên Nga, Hoàng Dung, Văn Việt, Ngọc Tiến, Bình Trọng, Đức Bình, Đại Mý, Thanh Thủy, Thu Bên, Kim Dung, Xuân Thủy, Thu Quyên, Minh Hằng, Sĩ Anh, Ngọc Tuấn, Tiến Thắng, Thùy Linh...		Romance, Drama	

== VTV3 Sunday Literature & Art dramas ==
These dramas air in early Sunday afternoon on VTV3 as a part of the program Sunday Literature & Art (Vietnamese: Văn nghệ Chủ Nhật).

- Note: The time slot was delayed on 2 Feb due to the broadcast schedule for Tết programs.

Broadcast	Title	Eps.	Prod.	Cast and crew	Theme song(s)	Genre	Notes
5 Jan	Chung một mái nhà (Shared Roof)	1	VTV Film Prod.	Lê Tuấn Anh (director)		Drama	
12 Jan	Ranh giới (The Boundary)	1 (90′)	VTV Film Prod.	Vũ Hồng Sơn (director); Trần Anh Đào (writer); Tăng Nhật Tuệ, Thu An, Minh Hòa, Phạm Cường, Minh Phương, Bạc Mai A, Thanh Thảo, Tuấn Quang, Phương Thủy, Thế Tuấn, Tuấn Hải, Vân Nam, Hoàng Tuấn...		Psychological, Drama	Based on a true story
19-26 Jan	Người ở bến sông (The One at the River Wharf)	2 (70′)	VTV Film Prod.	Nguyễn Danh Dũng (director); Phạm Ngọc Tiến (writer); Ngọc Dung, Dũng Nhi, Xuân Bắc, Thu Hương, Thanh Duyên, Thanh Tú, Trần Hạnh, Hoàng Yến...		Drama, Romance	
9 Feb	May ơi... là may (Luck and Luck)	1 (75′)	VTV Film Prod.	Đỗ Đức Thành (director); Phạm Kim Anh (writer); Đức Khuê, Kiều Anh, Tăng Dương, Quốc Quân, Tiến Đạt, Phương Khanh, Tuyết Liên, Khôi Nguyên, Vũ Tăng, Thanh Loan, Thu Vân, Thu Hằng, Phạm Tư, Lan Phượng, Hương Anh, Toàn Phương...		Comedy, Romance	Produced as a Tet drama
16 Feb	Tinh tướng (Bumptious)	1	VTV Film Prod.	Phạm Thanh Phong (director); Phạm Gia Phương (writer); Đức Hiệp, Sỹ Tiến, Thanh Dương, Thu Dung, Lệ Hằng, Tú Oanh, Bá Anh, Hồng Gấm...		Comedy	Produced as a Tet drama
23 Feb-9 Mar	Dưới tán lá rợp (Under the Foliage)	3	VTV Film Prod.	Vũ Trường Khoa (director); Nguyễn Thị Ngọc Tú (writer); Minh Lượng, Công Dũng, Việt Hà, Ngọc Tản, Khôi Nguyên, Thanh Lâm, Thùy Dương, Tuyết Mai...		Drama, Romance, Marriage	
16-23 Mar	Hến ơi là Hến (Midstream)	2 (70′)	VTV Film Prod.	Mạc Văn Chung (director); Lê Công Hội (writer); Hạnh Đạt, Kiều Thanh, Quốc Khánh, Ngọc Dung, Phú Đôn, Cao Nga, Việt Thắng, Ngọc Nam, Thanh Tùng, Tiến Minh, Kim Thoa, Lê Quân, Đức Mẫn, Trần Tâm...		Drama, Rural	
30 Mar	Những người bạn cũ (Old Friends)	1 (70′)	VTV Film Prod.	Bùi Huy Thuần (director); Mai Vui (writer); Mai Phương, Hương Ly, Hồ Lan, Minh Phương, Phạm Hồng Minh, Trần Thụ, Lê Va, Tuấn Quang, Huyền Thanh, Hoàng Thái, Minh Đức, Ngọc Tuyết, Trung Anh, Tuấn Hải, Tuấn Cường, Anh Tú, Huy An, Phương Thảo, Thu Cúc...		Drama, Crime	
6-13 Apr	Người tử tế sa ngã (Fallen Good Guy)	2 (75′)	VTV Film Prod.	Nguyễn Hữu Phần (director); Phạm Văn Khôi (writer); Trần Quốc Trọng, Mai Ngọc Căn, Vân Anh, Tuyết Liên, Quang Thiện, Đình Linh, Văn Đại, Lệ Hằng, Quang Tùng, Hoàng Hà, Hữu Độ, Duy Thái, Thành Trung, Thế Tục, Duy Thanh, Diệu Ân, Mạnh Kiên...		Drama	
20 Apr	Đi tìm ngày mai (Seeking Future)	1	VTV Film Prod.	Hoàng Lâm (director); Nguyễn Toàn Thắng (writer)		Drama	
27 Apr-4 May	Tiếng chim đêm (Bird Sound in the Night)	2	VTV Film Prod.			Drama	
11-18 May	Những tầng cao nghiệt ngã (The Grim Buildings)	2	VTV Film Prod.	Nguyễn Anh Tuấn (director & writer); Phú Thăng, Trần Thụ, Thúy Hà, Bích Ngọc, Tiến Đạt, Duy Thanh, Tạ Am, Xuân Đồng, Thanh Tùng, Phùng Khánh Linh...		Drama	
25 May-1 Jun	Người đợi ở Pờ Sa (Waiting at Pờ Sa)	2	VTV Film Prod.	Nguyễn Thế Hồng (director); Nguyễn Xuân Hải (writer); Mai Hương, Tuyết Liên, Đức Long, Hữu Nam, Mai Ngọc Căn, Cao Hùng, Mạnh Kiểm, Ngọc Tuấn, Trần Thái Sơn, Vũ Tiến, Duy Anh, Khắc Y, Ngọc Lâm, Mỹ Linh, Huy Thông, Nguyễn Vinh, Nguyễn Thị Lương Thiện, Lò Thanh Sùm, Lò Thị Thu Hà...		Drama, Ethnic, Crime	Produced to celebrate 45 Years of Vietnam Border Guard Traditional Day
8 Jun-6 Jul; 10 Aug-21 Sep	Khi đàn chim trở về (When the Birds Return)	12; Pt.1: 5e Pt.2: 7e	VTV Film Prod.	Đỗ Chí Hướng, Nguyễn Danh Dũng (directors); Nguyễn Ngọc Đức (writer); Duy Thanh, Lý Thanh Kha, Thu Hạnh, Anh Tuấn, Diệu Thảo, Linh Vân, Hồng Chương, Kiều Thanh, Mai Nguyên, Hồng Quân, Hồ Phong, Bình Xuyên, Ngọc Dung, Hồng Giang, Tuấn Dương...	'Khi đàn chim trở về' theme song by Trọng Tấn, Hương Giang & Sơn Ca Choir	Drama, Crime, Ethnic	Pt.2 airs one month after the ending of Pt. 1
13-20 Jul	Dòng chảy (The Flow)	2	VTV Film Prod.			Drama	
27 Jul-3 Aug	Nữ phóng viên (The Reporter)	2	VTV Film Prod.	Phạm Việt Đức (director); Hoàng Nhung (writer); Minh Thảo, Hồng Gấm, Lâm Tùng, Công Lý, Hữu Độ, Chu Hùng, Kim Xuyến, Trần Thụ, Đức Long, Mai Lan...		Drama, Political, Crime	
28 Sep-5 Oct	Ánh chiều chạng vạng (Dusk Light)	2	VFC	Mạc Văn Chung (director); Mạc Văn Chung, Đoàn Quốc Thắng (writers); Thanh Tuyết, Anh Quân, Thành An, Hồng Nhung, Phan Hòa, Ngọc Dung, Tùng Dương, Văn Toản, Sĩ Tự, Tiến Minh, Hải Phong, Xuân Hòa, Đông Hà...		Drama, Slice-of-Life	
12 Oct-9 Nov	Gió ngược chiều (Crosswind)	5	VFC	Bùi Huy Thuần (director); Đặng Văn Ký (writer); Phạm Hồng Minh, Minh Phương, Dương Tùng, Hồng Nhung, Nguyễn Chung, Ngọc Tản, Ngọc Thoa, Anh Dũng, Tuyết Liên, Khôi Nguyên, Phú Thăng, Thành An, Minh Tuấn, Thanh Hùng, Quốc Tuấn, Vân Anh, Văn Phòng, Trần Thụ, Thu Hiền,...	'Gió ngược chiều' theme song	Drama, Romance, Post-war	Based on Trần Hiệp's novel 'Chuyện tình thời hậu chiến'
16 Nov-14 Dec	Sự thật (The Truth)	4	VFC	Bạch Diệp (director); Hoàng Nhung (writer); Minh Châu, Khánh Huyền, Thanh Qúy, Duy Thanh, Diệu Thuần, Anh Dũng, Quyết Thắng, Hồng Minh, Hữu Độ, Bích Ngọc, Đức Thuận, Đức Long, Hạnh Kiểm, Tuấn Dương, Hải Anh, Quang Vịnh, Thu Hà, Bình Xuyên, Trần Thụ, Thanh Thảo, Thanh Tùng...		Drama, Office, Crime, Family	Delay 1 ep on 7 Dec due to the 22nd SEA Games report
21 Dec 2003- 4 Jan 2004	Một chuyện đời thường (An Ordinary Life Story)	3 (70′)	VFC	Nguyễn Thế Hồng (director); Nguyễn Thị Thu (writer); Phú Thăng, Minh Phương, Mạnh Kiểm, Bích Thủy, Thanh Hương, Mỹ Hạnh, Bích Ngọc, Ngọc Thu, Quang Ánh, Cao Thị Nga, Quốc Trung, Thanh Thủy, Thanh Hòa, Nguyễn Thúy, Duy Anh...		Drama, Marriage, Family	Based on short story of 'Bốn bức thư' by Lê Văn Thảo

== For The First Time On VTV3 Screen dramas ==
These dramas air in Sunday night after the 19:00 News Report (aired later or delayed in occasions of special events) under the name of the program For The First Time On VTV3 Screen (Vietnamese: Lần đầu tiên trên màn ảnh VTV3). The time slot has been closed since December this year and not opened again, partly because of the broadcast schedule for 22nd SEAGames.

- Note: Unlisted airtime periods were spent for special events.

Broadcast	Title	Eps.	Prod.	Cast and crew	Theme song(s)	Genre	Notes
19 Jan	Mật đắng (Bitter Bile)	1		Hoàng Thanh Du (director); Hoàng Quảng Uyên (writer); Phạm Đông, Tiến Đạt, Phạm Hồng Minh, Lệ Thu, Hoàng Thanh Giang, Lê Dũng, Thu Hường...		Drama, Comedy	
9 Feb-6 Apr	Nấc thang mới (New Step)	8	VTV Film Prod.	Trọng Trinh (director); Hoàng Nhung (writer); Mỹ Duyên, Minh Tiệp, Thi Huyền, Tự Long, Bích Ngọc, Mai Hương, Lê Công Tuấn, Hoàng Thanh Du, Trần Trung, Hồ Liên, Trần Thụ, Huyền Thanh, Hồng Tước, Trọng Trinh, Mậu Hòa, Tạ Am, Nam Cường, Kim Thanh, Lan Anh, Tuyết Nhung, Công Lý, Xuân Thông...		Drama, Romance	Delayed 1 ep on 16 Mar
13 Apr	Miền nhớ (Domain of Memory)	1		Nguyễn Trọng Thắng (director); Nguyễn Thị Khánh Vy (writer); Trần Hạnh, Diệu Thảo, Lương Hữu Đại, Hoàng Sơn, Ngọc Tản, Thu Hường, Văn Thành, Huyền Thanh...		Drama, Rural	
20 Apr	Followed by the playback of Hẹn gặp lại (See You Again). The single-episode drama was first released on H channel in 2003 Tet holiday.						
11-18 May	Song nữ (Double Female)	2			Gegege no Kitarou by Yoshi Ikuzo	Drama, Crime	
25 May-1 Jun	Followed by the playback of Ước nguyện trước hoàng hôn (Desire Before Sunset), 2 episodes. The drama was first released on H channel in 2001.						
8-15 Jun	Followed by the playback of Đâu phải vợ người ta (Not Someone's Wife). The drama was first released on HTV9 channel in 2002.						
22 Jun	Followed by the playback of Ráng chiều (Evening Clouds). The single-episode drama was first released on HTV7 channel in 1997.						
29 Jun-31 Aug	Cảnh sát hình sự: Cổ cồn trắng II (Criminal Police: White Collar II)	10	VTV Film Prod.	Vũ Minh Trí (director); Nguyễn Như Phong (writer); Phạm Cường, An Chinh, Tuấn Quang, Minh Đức, Hải Anh, Anh Tuấn, Trần Đức, Nguyễn Hải, Phát Triệu, Duy Thanh, Hà Văn Trọng, Quốc Quân, Huy Thông, Hoàng Mai, Đức Tuệ, Mỹ Duyên, Ngọc Yến, Minh Châu, Anh Dũng, Bùi Tuấn, Mỹ Linh, Trần Anh, Anh Quân, Thu Hà, Hà Hương, Đức Thuận, Hồ Phong, Quang Hải, Anh Cường, Đình San, Mai Liên, Tuấn Hưng, Nguyễn Thụ, Tuyết Liên...	Những bàn chân lặng lẽ (Quiet Steps) by Thùy Dung	Crime, Drama, Political	Following up Cảnh sát hình sự: Cổ cồn trắng (2002). Ep 1-2 air back-to-back on 29 Jun. Delay 1 ep on 24 Aug.
14 Sep-23 Nov	Cảnh sát hình sự: Phía sau một cái chết (Criminal Police: Behind a Case of Death)	10	VFC	Trọng Trinh (director); Đặng Phạm Trần (writer); Trọng Trinh, Minh Tiệp, Minh Châu, Hà Văn Trọng, Hữu Độ, Quách Thu Phương, Mỹ Duyên, Thanh Tú, Đăng Khoa, Viết Liên, Thu Nga, Nguyễn Chung, Trần Hạnh, Thương An, Mai Hòa, Trần Thụ, Đức Khuê, Hồng Khang, Hoàng Thanh Du, Ngọc Tuyết, Quốc Quân, Ngọc Tản, Kim Thanh, Phan Anh Dũng, Thanh Quý, Thế Tục, Lưu Hà, Thanh Minh, Kim Anh, Phát Triệu, Tuyết Mai, Kim Liên...	Những bàn chân lặng lẽ (Quiet Steps) by Thùy Dung	Crime, Drama	a.k.a Cảnh sát điều tra (Investigating Police). Adapted from the novel of the same name by Võ Duy Linh. Ep 1-2 air back-to-back on 14 Sep. Delay 2 ep on 5 & 19 Oct.

== See also ==
- List of dramas broadcast by Vietnam Television (VTV)
- List of dramas broadcast by Hanoi Radio Television (HanoiTV)
- List of dramas broadcast by Vietnam Digital Television (VTC)
