= List of VTV dramas broadcast in 2004 =

This is a list of VTV dramas released in 2004.

←2003 - 2004 - 2005→

== VTV Tet dramas ==
These films air on VTV channels during Tet holiday.

=== VTV1 ===
Broadcast	Title	Eps.	Prod.	Cast and crew	Theme song(s)	Genre	Notes
22 Jan	Khoảnh khắc giao mùa (Moment of Changing Season)	1 (85′)	VFC	Mạc Văn Chung (director & writer); Quốc Khánh, Tùng Dương, Ngọc Dung, Thanh Tuyết, Đức Long, Đức Mẫn, Văn Thân, Hồng Chương, Thanh Loan, Yến Nga, Mai Hương, Thu Hiền, Phương Nga, Văn Vịnh, Hữu Tiệp, Đông Hà...		Rural, Comedy	Airs 06:30, 1st Tet holiday. A part of Trần Cung the series by Mạc Văn Chung.
24 Jan	Thế mới là cuộc đời (That's Life)	1 (80′)	VFC	Trọng Trinh (drrector); Vân Ngọc (writer); Quang Thắng, Phú Đôn, Tuấn Minh, Thanh Tú, Anh Dũng, Hồ Liên, Đức Hiệp, Mai Hòa, Quốc Quân, Công Lý, Tùng Dương, Văn Trung, Đức Hải, Thu Hương, Trang Dung, Hương Giang, Phương Anh...		Comedy, Drama, Office	Airs 21:30, 3rd Tet holiday

=== VTV3 ===
Broadcast	Title	Eps.	Prod.	Cast and crew	Theme song(s)	Genre	Notes
22 Jan	Bên ngoài cuộc đời (Outside Of Life)	1 (70′)	VFC	Nguyễn Hữu Phần, Vũ Hồng Sơn (directors); Khuất Thị Vân Huyền (writer); Mai Ngọc Căn, Hữu Độ, Nguyễn Xuân Hậu, Lê Hoàng Uyên, Vũ Huy Trinh, Phương Anh, Thanh Tùng, Thanh Phương, Ngọc Hoàn, Huy Lâm, Lê Văn, Chí Thành, Quốc Bảo, Phạm Hòa Nhân, Phạm Minh Hiển...		Drama, Slice-of-Life	Airs 12:00, 1st Tet holiday. Adapted from short story of the same name by Thái Bá Tân.
22 Jan	Cái dằm (The Splinter)	1 (85′)	VFC	Phạm Thanh Phong (director); Gia Phương (writer); Chí Trung, Tú Oanh, Thanh Dương, Quang Thắng, Kim Hoàn, Phạm Phương Dung, Trần Vũ Quân, Ngô Quang Dũng...		Comedy, Marriage	Airs 17:30, 1st Tet holiday
22 Jan	Lấy vợ cho sếp (Get Boss a Wife)	1 (75′)	VFC	Nguyễn Anh Tuấn (director); Văn Anh Đáng (writer); Phạm Bằng, Thế Bình, Hồ Liên, Tuấn Dương, Kim Thêu, Văn Thị Đáng, Phạm Đức Hải, Nam Cường, Huyền Thanh, Minh Hồng, Minh Tuân, Mạnh Hùng, Hải Nam, Hương Thảo, Thu Hà, Đoan Trang, Thanh Tùng, Ngân Bình, Văn Thanh, Văn Dương...		Comedy	Airs 21:50, 1st Tet holiday

== VTV1 Weeknight Vietnamese dramas ==
These dramas air from 21:00 to 22:00, Monday to Friday on VTV1.

- Note: Unlisted airtime periods were spent for special events.

Broadcast	Title	Eps.	Prod.	Cast and crew	Theme song(s)	Genre	Notes
5-11 Feb	Tình xa (Far Away)	5	VFC and Kantana Group	Vũ Trường Khoa, Anuwat Thanomrod (directors); Lương Xuân Thủy (writer); Hà Hương, Atsadawut Luengsuntorn, Công Dũng, Siriwan Yoisagul, May Fuengarom, Đàm Hằng, Thùy Dương, Minh Châu, Junko Takakuwa, Peter Akesson, Văn Lượng, Kanang Amatyakul, Hương Dung, Hương An, Tuyết Liên, Ngọc Tản, Suchao Pongwilai, Naolprang Trichit, Pojet Kanpetch, Daongjai Hathaikarn...	Tình xa (Long Distance Love) by Khánh Linh	Romance, Drama	Filming in Vietnam and Thailand
12-27 Feb	Followed by the playback of Sương gió biên thùy (Windy Foggy Borderland), 21 episodes (30′), 2 episodes per night except the final. The drama was first released on HTV7 channel in 2002.						
1-8 Mar	Followed by the playback of Chuyện tình bên dòng kênh xáng (Love Story By the Canal), 6 episodes. The drama was first released on HTV7 channel in 2002.						
9-11 Mar	Cánh gió đầu đông (The Wind Vane For Early Winter)	3	VFC	Vũ Hồng Sơn (director); Phạm Vũ Ngọc Anh (writer); Thu Huyền, Trung Anh, Minh Tiệp, Thu Hường, Quang Hưng, Diệu Hương, Bình Nam, Đức Trung, Xuân Tiên, Thanh Nga, Văn Quyến, Thúy Vinh, Quang Hải, Mạnh Hùng, Tuyết Lan...		Drama, Marriage	Adapted from short story of the same name by Thùy Linh
12 Mar	Sắc đỏ chôm chôm (Rambutan's Red Colour)	1 (67′)	VTV Center in HCMC (Note: Vietnamese: Trung tâm truyền hình Việt Nam tại thành phố Hồ Chí Minh; present-day VTV Center in Southern Vietnam (Vietnamese: Trung tâm truyền hình Việt Nam khu vực Nam Bộ))	Trần Lương (director); Chu Lai (writer); Lê Khanh, Xuân Thảo, Viết Vinh, Bá Thi, Chu Hiển, Phương Thảo, Ngọc Biết, Ngọc Dũng, Hoàng Phúc...		Historical, Drama	Adapted from short story of the same name by Chu Lai.
15-19 Mar	Followed by the playback of Màu hoa nhớ (A Flower to Remember), 5 episodes. The drama was first released on THTPCT channel in 2003.						
22 Mar-12 May	Followed by the playback of Người đàn bà yếu đuối (A Feeble Woman), 59 episodes (30′), 2 episodes per night except the final. The drama was first released on HTV7 channel in 2002. Note: Delayed 8 times on 5 Apr, 16 Apr, 26 Apr, 28 Apr, 30 Apr, 5–7 May.						
6 May	Bức ảnh còn lại (The Remaining Photo)	1 (80′)	VFC	Vũ Hồng Sơn (director); Thanh Hân (writer); Hoàng Long, Lê Mai, Thúy Vinh, Hương Dung, Anh Túc, Tuấn Tú, Kiên Cường, Trà My, Diệu Hương, Hương Ly...		Drama, Historical, Fantasy	Produced to celebrate 50 years of Điện Biên Phủ Victory
13 May-2 Jun	Followed by the playback of Vị tướng tình báo và hai bà vợ (Intelligence General and His Two Wives), 29 episodes, 2 episodes per night except the final. The drama was first released on HTV7 channel in 2003.						
4-11 Jun	Followed by the playback of Họ từng chung kẻ thù (Sworn Brothers), 6 episodes. The drama was first released on BTV1 channel in 2003.						
14 Jun-9 Jul	Followed by the playback of Giao thời (Transitional Period), 20 episodes. The drama was first released on HTV7 channel in 2000.						
12-27 Jul	Followed by the playback of Nước mắt của biển (Tears of the Ocean), 12 episodes. The drama was first released on THP channel in 2002.						
28 Jul-3 Aug	Followed by the playback of Lời thề Đất Mũi (The Oath in Cape Land), episode 1 to episode 5. The drama was first released on VTV1 channel in 2003.						
4-10 Aug	Followed by Lời thề Đất Mũi (The Oath in Cape Land), episode 6 to episode 10.						
11-27 Aug	Followed by the playback of Con sẽ là cô chủ (I Will Be Wealthy), 12 episodes (originally 6 eps). The drama was first released on H channel in 1996. Note: Delayed 1 episode on 19 Aug.						
19 Aug	Followed by the playback of the movie Truy tìm X.413 (Seeking X.413) to celebrate the August Revolution.						
31 Aug-25 Oct	Followed by the playback of Blouse trắng (White Blouse), 70 episodes (30′), 2 episodes per night. The drama was first released on HTV7 channel in 2002. Note: Delayed 4 times on 2 Sep, 22 Sep, 24 Sep, 4 Oct.						
2 Sep	Followed by the playback of Sang sông (Crossing the River) to celebrate Independence Day. The single-episode drama was first released on VTV3 channel in 2002.						
26 Oct-1 Nov	Lời thề cỏ non (The Sapling Vow)	5	VFC	Hoàng Lâm (director); Nguyễn Khải Hưng (idea); Đỗ Trí Hùng (writer); Việt Anh, Hồng Đăng, Diệu Hương, Văn Bích, Phương Điệp, Đức Tùng, Thanh Tú, Thanh Quý, Minh Châu, Diễm Lộc, Hoàng Dũng, Trần Ðức, Trọng Trinh...	Lời thề cỏ non (The Sapling Vow) by Khánh Linh	Drama, Youth, Slice-of-Life	Based on a true story. Specially produced for the 1st VFC TV acting class.
2-9 Nov	Followed by the playback of Mía đắng (Bitter Cane), 6 episodes. The drama was first released on VTV3 channel in 2000.						
10 Nov-3 Dec	Followed by the playback of Giọt nước mắt giữa hai thế kỷ (The Teardrop Between Two Centuries), 16 episodes (originally 10 eps). The drama was first released on H channel in 1997. Note: Delayed 2 eps on 18 & 25 Nov.						
6-7 Dec	Followed by the playback of Kiếm sống (Earning to Live), 2 episodes. The drama was first released on HTV7 in 2003.						
8-9 Dec	Followed by the playback of Giữa đời thường (In the Middle of Ordinary Life), 2 episodes. The drama was first released on HTV7 in 2002.						
10 Dec	Followed by the playback of Câu chuyện quanh trái bóng (All About Football) in the occasion of the 2004 Tiger Cup. The single-episode drama was first released on VTV3 channel in 2002.						
13-14 Dec	Followed by the playback of Phố hoài (Nostalgia in Town), 2 episodes. The drama was first released on HTV7 in 2002.						
15-17 Dec	Followed by the playback of Đón con về (Welcome Home, Son), 2 episodes, delayed 1 episode on 16 Dec. The drama was first released on HTV7 in 2002.						
21 Dec	Bên bến đò Lăng (By the Wharf of Lăng)	1 (75′)	VFC	Trần Quốc Trọng (director); Phùng Văn Khai (writer); Lan Hương 'Bông', Văn Anh, Kim Phụng, Kiều Minh Hiếu, Phạm Thị Tần, Thúy Hà, Bích Liên, Minh Cường, Thúy Vinh, Minh Hoa, Phương Loan, Tiến Dương, Minh Hiển...	Gatherway by Hidemi Miura	Post-war, Romance, Drama, Propaganda	To celebrate People's Army Day. Adapted from short story of the same name by Phùng Văn Khai.
22 Dec	Followed by the playback of the 2002 feature film Hà Nội 12 ngày đêm (Hà Nội: 12 Days and Nights) to celebrate the victory of Điện Biên Phủ in the Air.						
23 Dec 2004- 3 Jan 2005	Followed by Lời thề Đất Mũi (The Oath in Cape Land), episode 11 to episode 17 (End). *Note: Episode 16 airs 22:15 on 31 Dec						

== Vietnamese dramas in VTV3 nightly time slot ==
Starting from December 2003, Monday to Saturday night time slot for foreign dramas and Sunday night time slot for Vietnamese dramas were merged.

These dramas air every night of the week (except the occasions of special events) on VTV3. The broadcasting time usually is after the 19:00 News Report (21:00 to 22:00 on Thursday and Friday, 19:50 to 20:50 on the others).

- Note: Unlisted airtime periods were spent for foreign dramas.

Broadcast	Title	Eps.	Prod.	Cast and crew	Theme song(s)	Genre	Notes
7-20 Jan	Cảnh sát hình sự: Cô gái đến từ Băng Cốc (Criminal Police: The Girl From Bangkok)	10	VFC	Mai Hồng Phong (director); Linh Ngọc, Khuất Vân Huyền (writers); Hoàng Xuân, Tuấn Quang, Minh Tiệp, Khánh Vân, Tạ Am, Chu Hùng, Phạm Hồng Minh, Anh Tuấn, Quốc Quân, Trương Thu Hà, Quốc Trị, Thùy Dung, Văn Hùng, Đức Điền, Quý Hùng, Xuân Hảo, Trung Đức, Ngọc Quyền, Châu Giang, Tiến Lực, Quang Lan, Viết Sơn, Tăng Nhật Tuệ...	Những bàn chân lặng lẽ (Quiet Steps) by Thùy Dung	Crime, Drama	Delay 4 eps on 8, 9, 15 & 18 Jan. Filming in Vietnam and Thailand.
22 Sep-3 Oct	Cảnh sát hình sự: Thế giới không đàn bà (Criminal Police: World Without Women)	10	VFC	Vũ Minh Trí (director); Thùy Linh, Đinh Như Trang (writers); Vũ Phan Anh, Tuấn Quang, Minh Tiệp, Minh Hải, Đào Văn Bích, Đức Trung, Thu Hường, Mỹ Duyên, Trần Đức, Dũng Nhi, Ngọc Thoa, Kiều Thanh, Phú Thăng, Anh Tuấn, Minh Nguyệt, Quốc Hùng, Quốc Quân, Đức Hiệp, Quốc Hưng, Đức Điền, Trần Nhượng, Cường Việt, Anh Quang, Như Hương, Nam Cường, Vân Ly, Tiến Chính, Đức Thuận, Viết Vinh, Khôi Nguyên, Phương Khanh, Tạ Am...	Những bàn chân lặng lẽ (Quiet Steps) by Thùy Dung	Crime, Drama	Delay 2 eps on 26 & 28 Sep. Based on the novel of 'Một thế giới không có đàn bà' by Bùi Anh Tấn. After this film, the series has moved from VTV3 to VTV1 and start broadcasting the series on VTV1 with Lãnh Địa Đen (Dark Territory) in 2005.

== VTV3 Cinema For Saturday Afternoon dramas ==
These dramas air in early Saturday afternoon on VTV3 with the duration approximately 70 minutes as a part of the program Cinema for Saturday afternoon (Vietnamese: Điện ảnh chiều thứ Bảy).

Broadcast	Title	Eps.	Prod.	Cast and crew	Theme song(s)	Genre	Notes
3-10 Jan	Những người cha "Bất đắc dĩ" (Accidental Fathers)	2		Nguyễn Thế Vĩnh (director); Đỗ Trí Hùng (writer); Hồng Quang, Hải Anh, Xuân Dương, Quỳnh Tứ, Ngọc Chi, Thùy Liên, Văn Thắng, Hạnh Ly, Bằng Linh, Quang Hiếu...		Drama, Comedy	
17-24 Jan	Đêm mưa (Rainy Night)	2	VFC	Nguyễn Hữu Luyện (director); Lưu Trọng Hồng (writer); Thúy Hiền, Anh Tú, Thanh Hiền, Duy Thanh, Hương Dung, Trịnh Huyền, Thùy Dung, Như Lai, Hồng Thái, Trà Mi...		Drama, Romance	Airs as a part of Tet dramas series
31 Jan-7 Feb	Tìm người trong tranh (Seeking You From the Painting)	2		Nguyễn Anh Dũng (director); Đặng Minh Liên (writer); Minh Tiệp, Thu Giang, Phương Thanh, Mai Hương, Phương Nga, Văn Phú, Trần Quang Vịnh, Thùy Linh, Thanh Thúy, Mạnh Thụ, Thu Tản, Thành An, Lan Minh, Danh Nhân, Hồng Bích, Mạnh Hải, Hoàng Ngân...		Drama, Romance	
14-21 Feb	Hoa đào ngày Tết (Peach Blossom)	2	Feature Film Studio I	Xuân Sơn (director); Đào Thùy Trang (writer); Đức Khuê, Thùy Dương, Tuyết Liên, Trần Hạnh, Mai Châu, Xuân Thức, Kim Vân, Thu Trang, Vũ Văn Tăng, Hương Lan, Quang Đại...	'Hoa đào ngày Tết' theme song by An Quý	Drama, Romance	
28 Feb-6 Mar	Như chuyện trầu cau (Like the Story of Betel and Areca)	2	Bến Nghé Film	Võ Việt Hùng (director); Tô Hoàng (writer); Thanh Thúy, Tô Minh Tuấn, Quế Phương, Đức Tiến, Ánh Hoa, Quang Hiếu, Ngọc Xuân, Thành Tùng, Bảo Khương...		Drama	Based on short story of the same name by Trần Văn Tuấn
13-20 Mar	Người đẹp Yasan (The Beauty of Yasan)	2	Giải Phóng Film	Hứa Vĩ Văn...		Drama, Ethnic	
27 Mar-3 Apr	Bảy ngày... làm vợ (Seven Days As A Wife)	2	VFS	Hữu Mười, Phạm Quang Xuân (directors); Khánh Hoài, Đoàn Trúc Quỳnh (writers); Hoàng Sơn, Trịnh Huyền, Mai Phượng, Phú Đôn, Hồ Liên, Thanh Vân, Phương Nga, Phan Dung, Hồng Gấm, Diễm Lộc...		Comedy, Marriage	
10-17 Apr	Chuyện làng Một (Story of Một Village)	2		Nguyễn Huy Hoàng (director); Đoàn Trúc Quỳnh, Nguyễn Hữu Nhàn (writers); Hoàng Mai, Quế Hằng, Hoàng Quân Tạo, Ngọc Tản, Nguyễn Trung, Đỗ Thị Thêu, Trần Chí Trung, Hồng Giang, Lê Thế Tục, Trần Tiệp, Văn Thông...	'Chuyện làng Một' theme song by Quỳnh Hoa	Rural, Drama	
24 Apr-1 May	Vẫn còn đó tình yêu (Love's Still There)	2		Trần Lực (director); Lê Ngọc Minh, Đoàn Trúc Quỳnh, Nguyễn Hữu Ứng, Nguyễn Đoàn Thắng (writers); Trung Hiếu, Lệ Hằng, Phát Triệu, Tuyết Mai, Diệp Anh...		Drama, Romance	
8 May-26 Jun	Một thời ngang dọc (Eventful Time)	8	Giải Phóng Film, VTV and BTV	Xuân Cường (director); Phạm Thùy Nhân (writer); Quyền Linh, Lâm Bảo Như, Thương Tín, Quế Trân, Công Hậu, Hoài An, Hồng Tơ, Phương Điền, Lê Bình, Thành Lũy, Nguyễn Châu, Mỹ Dung, Nguyệt Nhi, Quỳnh Nga, Timbert, Thanh Hoa, Nguyễn Hùng, Mạnh Hùng, Hoàng Trung, Đông Hạ, Quốc Cường, Mạc Cạn, Raja Ramani, Quang Hiếu, Chinh Nhân, Tú Thanh...	Một thời ngang dọc (Eventful Time) by Lâm Vũ & Thanh Trúc	Drama, Action, Period	Based on several literary works by Sơn Nam. First released on BTV1 since 22 Apr.
3-10 Jul	Hoa xuyến chi (Flower of Promising)	2	VFC	Nguyễn Hữu Luyện (director); Đoàn Thị Mai Anh (writer); Thanh Hải, Hoàng Yến, Quỳnh Hoa, Lã Thanh Huyền, Ngọc Thoa, Minh Phương, Hồng Hải, Thanh Hiền, Quang Vinh, Văn Thành, Thanh Dương, Thanh Thủy, Khuất Quỳnh Hoa, Thanh Nhàn, Văn Trinh...	Silk Road Gensou by Kitaro	Drama, Romance, Rural	Based on short story of the same name by Lưu Quang Vũ
17-24 Jul	Hạt bụi, hạt đời (Dust and Life)	2		Lê Anh Cường (director); Hoàng Nga, Trường Thịnh, Lê Minh, Mai Huỳnh, Hồ Lê Nguyên Khôi, Đinh Y Nhung...		Drama	
31 Jul-14 Aug	Người mất ngủ (Insomnia)	3		Hoàng Thanh Du (director); Nguyễn Hữu Đức (writer); Trí Đức, Hoàng Mai, Khôi Nguyên, Bá Cường, Thanh Tùng, Kiều Thanh, Vân Anh, Tuấn Quang, Ngọc Trung, Mai Hương, Tiến Minh...	'Người mất ngủ' theme song by Hoàng Anh	Drama, Family, Romance	
21 Aug-4 Sep	Trăng lạnh (Cold Moon)	2		Nguyễn Hữu Trọng, Trịnh Lê Phong (directors); Nguyễn Hữu Phần, Nguyễn Hữu Ứng (writers); Như Quỳnh, Đặng Tất Bình, Mạc Minh, Đàm Hằng, Vân Thủy, Vũ Phan Anh, Việt Đức, Hoàng Thắng, Quỳnh Tú, Thu Nga, Bá Cường, Thu Tấn, Tiến Mộc, Trần Công Lý, Diệu Hương, Emmanuel Anul, Gregra Smit...	Harako's Magical Circle; Composed by Seiji Yokoyama The Golem is Approaching ~ Let's All Protect Everyone! Composed by Seiji Yokoyama	Drama, Post-war	Delay 1 ep on 28 Aug
11-25 Sep	Không cô đơn (Not Alone)	3		Nguyễn Huy Hoàng (director); Đoàn Trúc Quỳnh (writer); Huyền Trang, Trần Thạch, Hoàng Mai, Kiều Thanh, Trần Nam Sơn, Chu Quỳnh Trang, Anh Khoa, Ngân Hà, Trà My...		Drama, Rural	Adapted from the novel of the same name by Nguyễn Hữu Nhàn
2-9 Oct	Tuyệt vọng (Desperado)	2		Nguyễn Mạnh Hà, Đào Duy Phúc (director); Đào Duy Phúc, Hồ Lan (writer); Kiều Minh Hiếu, Kiều Thanh, Mai Nguyên, Lâm Tùng, Thùy Vinh, Ngọc Tản...		Drama	
16 Oct-13 Nov	Trên cổng trời không có hoa anh túc (Sky Gate Without Poppies)	5		Hà Lê Sơn (director); Lê Thanh Thu, Hà Lê Sơn (writers); Lý Trung Kiên, Quỳnh Trang, Thảo Anh, Quỳnh Tứ, Lương Triệu Bắc...	'Trên cổng trời không có hoa anh túc' theme song	Drama, Ethnic, Crime	
20-27 Nov	Ở làng quê xa (A Village Far Away)	2		Phạm Quang Xuân (director); Lưu Nghiệp Quỳnh (writer); Đinh Trọng Nguyễn, Trịnh Huyền, Nguyễn Hà Vinh, Quang Ánh...		Rural, Drama	
4-11 Dec	Con chung (Our Child)	2		Trần Trung Dũng (director); Nguyễn Xuân Thành (writer); Đàm Hǎ̀ng, Công Dũng, Minh Phương, Ngọc Bích, Bá Cường, Tuấn Dương, Kim Tín, Bích Ngọc, Hoàng Trung, Thu Hương...	Fight! by Yumiko Takahashi	Drama, Marriage, Family	
18-25 Dec	Trái tim đồng bằng (The Plain Heart)	2	Giải Phóng Film	Trần Ngọc Phong (director); Lê Minh Sơn (writer); Thu Hương, Trung Dũng, Hoài An, Kim Phượng, Phương Bằng, Thanh Tú, Kỷ Cương, Minh Cường, Thanh Hà, Hoàng Khiêm, Vân Anh, Nguyễn Hoàng, Lan Hương, Hữu Thành, Lâm Thới...		Drama, Romance	

== VTV3 Sunday Literature & Art dramas ==
These dramas air in early Sunday afternoon on VTV3 as a part of the program Sunday Literature & Art (Vietnamese: Văn nghệ Chủ Nhật).

Broadcast	Title	Eps.	Prod.	Cast and crew	Theme song(s)	Genre	Notes
11 Jan	Những cánh hoa mong manh (Fragile Petals)	1 (75′)	VFC	Vũ Minh Trí (director); Đặng Diệu Hương (writer); Dũng Nhi, Thanh Hương, Duy Anh, Ngọc Thoa, Hoàng Chung, Trung Anh, Ngọc Dung, Thu Quế, Hoàng Lan...		Drama, Family, Crime	
18 Jan	Tháng Chạp... chỉ có một ngày (The Last Month Only Lasts One Day)	1 (75′)	VFC	Lê Cường Việt (director); Nguyễn Ngọc Đức (writer); Thế Hoàng, Kiều Linh, Sĩ Tiến, Đức Trung, Mộng Thoa, Khôi Nguyên, Hoàng Yến, Hương Thảo, Thu Trang...		Drama, Comedy	
25 Jan-8 Feb	Biển trời mênh mang (Immense Sea and Sky)	3	VFC	Hoàng Trần Doãn (director); Bành Mai Phương (writer); Yến Vy, Anh Tuấn, Minh Châu, Chu Hùng, Thanh Quý, Chí Trung, Thanh Vân...		Drama, Marriage	Adapted from short story of 'Biển trời đầm phá mênh mang' by Hồng Như
15 Feb	Ngày nghỉ cuối tuần (Weekend Day-Off)	1	VFC	Khuất Quang Thụy (writer); Khôi Nguyên, An Ninh, Minh Phương, Đức Hải, Quỳnh Tứ, Mẫn Đức Kiên, Hải Phương, Thái Sơn, Thành Tùng, Cẩm Nhung, Trần Huỳnh, Trần Thị Mơ, Xuân Đại, Công Vương, Xuân Dương, Nguyễn Thị Tản...		Drama, Comedy	
22 Feb-18 Apr	Những giấc mơ dài (Endless Dreams)	9 (75′)	VFC	Đỗ Đức Thành (director); Nguyễn Thị Thu Huệ (writer); Mạnh Cường, Kiều Thanh, Thu Quế, Kim Oanh, Hải Anh, Tuấn Minh, Hoàng Mai, Cường Việt, Quốc Quân, Tùng Dương, Mai Lan, Hoàng Lan, Hồng Mi, Hồng Điệp, Trần Hạnh, Hữu Độ, Thu Hường, Anh Tuấn, Tiến Hợi, Tạ Minh Thảo, Hoàng Uyên, Hồng Thái, Phú Thăng, Ngọc Lan, Bích Hằng, Tạ Am, Ngọc Tuấn, Tuấn Quang, Ngọc Điều, Ngọc Huyền, Vân Anh, Như Hương, Hoàng Duy...	Những giấc mơ dài (Endless Dreams) by Mỹ Linh	Drama, Marriage, Romance	
25 Apr	Followed by the playback of Khoảnh khắc giao mùa (Moment of Changing Season). The single-episode drama was first released on VTV1 channel in 2004 Tet holiday.						
2-9 May	Chuyện trầu cau (Betel and Areca's Story)	2 (70′)	VFC	Nguyễn Thế Hồng (director); Nguyễn Thị Thu (writer); Quang Ánh, Mạnh Cường, Quỳnh Tứ, Thế Hồng, Mai Ngọc Căn, Nam Cường, Minh Quốc, Minh Đức, Linh Dược, Việt Anh, Mạnh Chinh, Thúy Nga, Ngọc Hương, Thúy Hồng, Thu Trang, Hồng Nhung, Khánh Linh, Ngọc Tân, Vân Quyền, Hoàng Thám, Nguyễn Kiên...	Tổ khúc hát đúm (A Suite of Hát đúm) by Triệu Trung Kiên	Drama, Old Fash ioned, Rural	Based on the old story of the same name
16 May-13 Jun	Đằng sau tội ác (Behind the Crime)	5	VFC	Vũ Trường Khoa (director); Vũ Ngọc Khôi (writer); Cao Đức Hùng, Đàm Hằng, Văn Bích, Quỳnh Hoa, Thu Huyền, Văn Lượng, Mỹ Duyên, Hồng Quân...		Drama, Crime	
20 Jun-11 Jul	Trận cầu đinh (The Derby)	4	VFC	Đỗ Chí Hướng (director); Nguyễn Long Khánh (writer); Duy Thanh, Đức Thuận, Quế Hằng, Đức Trung, Khôi Nguyên, Đào Hùng, Quang Vinh, Tạ Xuyên, Trần Nhượng, Trần Hùng, Hồ Phương, Phương Loan, Trọng Thủy, Tuấn Cường, Đức Kiên, Cao Cường, Quỳnh Trang, Quỳnh Hoa, Đặng Thị Dịu, Tuấn Thịnh, Ngọc Tuấn...		Drama, Sport	
18 Jul 2004- 2 Jan 2005	Đường đời (Walks of Life)	25 (75′)	VFC	Trần Quốc Trọng, Trần Hoài Sơn (directors); Trung Trung Đỉnh, Thùy Linh (writers); Hoàng Hải, Đồng Thu Hà, Trung Hiếu, Thương Huyền, Hồng Chương, Diễm Lộc, Dũng Nhi, Đặng Lưu Hà, Lý Thanh Thảo, Lê Nga, Tuyết Hoa, Ngọc Tản, Chu Văn Thức, Hoàng Thy, Trần Sinh, Hùng Khanh, Cẩm Huyền, Minh Hương, Thu Giang, Diệu Thúy, Thúy Hằng, Văn Trinh, Mai Ngọc Căn, Văn Dũng, Tạ Minh Thảo, Minh Hiền, Hoàng Thùy Linh, Quang Kỳ, Văn Lộc, Phát Triệu, Phương Loan, Trần Quốc Trọng, Lan Hương 'Bông', Thúy Nhung, Minh Tuấn, Thúy Nhân, Việt Châu, Thúy Vân, Tuấn Khanh, Ánh Hoa, Hoàng Khôi, Huy Anh, Văn Hòa, Thanh Tùng, Huy Thục...	Đường đời (Walks of Life) by Mai Hoa	Drama, Biography, Medical	Adapted from the novel of 'Nợ đời' by Hoàng Dự. Based on a true story of herbalist Nguyễn Hữu Khai.

== See also ==
- List of dramas broadcast by Vietnam Television (VTV)
- List of dramas broadcast by Hanoi Radio Television (HanoiTV)
- List of dramas broadcast by Vietnam Digital Television (VTC)==
