= List of VTV dramas broadcast in 2005 =

This is a list of VTV dramas released in 2005.

←2004 - 2005 - 2006→

== VTV Tet dramas ==
These films air on VTV channels during Tet holiday.

=== VTV1 ===
Broadcast	Title	Eps.	Prod.	Cast and crew	Theme song(s)	Genre	Notes
8 Feb	Ngôi nhà cổ tích (Fairy House)	1 (70′)	VFC	Nguyễn Khải Hưng (director); Trịnh Thanh Nhã (writer); Đồng Thu Hà, Mạnh Cường, Đường Minh Giang, Nguyễn Kiều Anh, Phương Minh, Lê Nam, Xuân Hậu, Phương Khanh, Kim Chi, Đức Thụ, Vân Anh, Tạ Am, Minh Hiền, Quốc Quân, Công Lý, Hồng Vân, Chí Thanh, Cao Cường, Hữu Bắc, Đức Hoàng, Minh Khánh...		Drama, Slice-of-Life, Romance	Airs 17:10, 30th Tet holiday
9 Feb	Công ty phá sản tạm thời (Temporarily Bankrupt Company)	1 (90′)	VFC	Mai Hồng Phong (director)		Comedy, Marriage	Airs 13:00, 1st Tet holiday
10 Feb	Mùa xuân trở lại (Back to the Spring)	1 (80′)	VFC	Bùi Huy Thuần (director); Nguyễn Đỗ Phú (writer); Ngọc Dung, Dương Đức Quang, Thu Hương, Viết Thao, Duy Anh, Phát Triệu, Tuyết Liên...		Drama, Romance, Family	Airs 21:30, 2nd Tet holiday

=== VTV3 ===
Broadcast	Title	Eps.	Prod.	Cast and crew	Theme song(s)	Genre	Notes
8 Feb	Bến lạ thành quen (Strange to Acquainted)	1 (75′)	VFC	Đỗ Chí Hướng (director); Nguyễn Thị Thu Huệ (writer); Phan Trí Tuệ, Trương Đình Quốc Khánh, Phạm Thị Hòa, Nguyễn Thị Thu Hồng, Quỳnh Tứ, Thu Hương, Huyền Thanh, Thanh Loan, Hoàng Thị Xuân, Thanh Tùng...		Romance, Drama	Airs 14:00, 30th Tet holiday
9 Feb	Nhà chật (Cramped Houses)	1 (70′)	VFC	Phạm Thanh Phong (director & writer); Chí Trung, Đức Hiệp, Lệ Hằng, Thu Hương, Phương Dung, Vũ Quân, Minh Đức, Thanh Dương, Nam Cường, Hồ Phong, Hồng Tuấn, Minh Châu, Đại Mý...		Comedy, Family	Airs 12:00, 1st Tet holiday
9 Feb	Đi tua thời hiện đại (Modernly Touring)	1 (70′)	VFC	Vũ Hồng Sơn (writer); Phạm Vân Ngọc (writer); Đình Chiến, Phú Đôn, Quế Hằng, Thanh Chi, Phương Mai, Quốc Khánh, Hữu Độ, Việt Thắng, Minh Đức, Văn Lý, Thương An, Thanh Hương, Thu Huyền, Minh Thư, Hồng Anh, Văn Hòa, Quang Thắng, Minh Ngọc, Huy Hoàng, Duy Quang, Mạnh Trung, Minh Chí...		Comedy	Airs 17:30, 1st Tet holiday

== Vietnamese dramas in VTV1 Monday to Saturday night time slot ==
Starting in 2005, the VTV1 night drama time slot was reduced back to one line-up (with the addition of Saturday night since March) for both Vietnamese and foreign dramas after a year and three months split in two lines (21:00-22:00 for Vietnamese dramas and 22:00-23:00 for foreign dramas).

These dramas air from 21:00 to 22:00 on Monday to Friday and 22:00 to 23:00 on Saturday, on VTV1

- Note: Unlisted airtime periods were spent for foreign dramas or special events.

Broadcast	Title	Eps.	Prod.	Cast and crew	Theme song(s)	Genre	Notes
27 Jan-3 Feb	Đồng Nọc Nạng (The Affair in Nọc Nạng Field)	5	VTV Center in HCMC & BLTV	Trần Vịnh (director); Chu Lai (writer); Minh Chiến, Hoa Thúy, Đoàn Dũng, Ngọc Hiền, Bạch Lan, Quốc Anh, Nam Cường, Việt Vinh, Xuân Thảo, Sơn Tây, Trần Hồng, Thành Nam, Minh Kha, Tấn Hưng...		Family, War, Drama, Historical	Delayed 1 ep on 31 Jan. Based on Phúc Vân's story 'Nọc Nạng'. First released on BLTV in 2004.
4-7 Feb	Followed by the playback of Anh Thơm râu rồng (Dragon Beard Brother Thơm), 2 episodes. The drama was first released on HTV7 channel in 2003.						
14 Feb-15 Mar	Chuyện phố phường (Old Quarter Story)	22	VFC	Phạm Thanh Phong, Nguyễn Danh Dũng (directors); Phạm Thanh Phong, Phạm Ngọc Tiến (writers); Hà Văn Trọng, Duy Hậu, Tùng Dương, Võ Hoài Nam, Vi Cầm, Xuân Tùng, Lệ Hằng, Thanh Quý, Thu Hường, Tuấn Minh, Hồng Quân, Thúy Phương, Kim Thoa, Ngọc Quỳnh, Ngọc Dung, Trần Đức, Lan Hương 'Bông', Hoàng Dũng, Văn Thành, Thu Hạnh, Hương Dung, Thành An, Hồng Hạnh, Phú Thăng, Cường Việt, Trần Nam, Danh Nhân, Hồng Đức, Vĩnh Xương, Mai Anh, Anh Tuấn, Mạnh Hiệp, Phương Minh, Thanh Huyền...	Chuyện phố phường (Old Quarter Story) by Mai Hoa	Family, Drama	Delay 2 eps on 17 & 24 Feb
17 Mar-13 Apr	Trò đùa của số phận (Joke of Fate)	19	VFC	Bùi Huy Thuần (director); Nguyễn Long Khánh (writer); Đồng Thu Hà, Dũng Nhi, Hải Anh, Nguyễn Hải, Trung Anh, Lệ Hằng, Tùng Dương, Công Lý, Thu Hà, Đình Chiến, Trần Thụ, Phú Thăng, Hoàng Thùy Linh, Thu Trang, Thu Hương, Thanh Giang, Ngọc Tản, Linh Huệ...	'Trò đùa của số phận' theme song Composed by Vũ Thảo	Drama, Marriage, Romance	Delay 5 eps on 24 Mar, 30 Mar, 2 Apr, 4 Apr, 6 Apr
15-23 Apr	Làng Cát (Sand Village)	5	VTV Center in HCMC & BTV	Trần Vịnh (director); Nguyễn Mạnh Tuấn (writer); Ngọc Hiền, Minh Đáng, Hoa Thúy, Văn Báu, Thúy Vân, Bá Thi, Quyên Bình, Tấn Hưng, Quang Minh, Thanh An, Kim Phượng, Kim Tuyến, Nhị Hà, Ngọc Ánh, Đình Hậu, Mỹ Hằng, Xuân Phi...	'Làng Cát' theme song by Thanh Thanh Hiền	War, Drama, Historical, Family	Following up Động cát đỏ & Người làng Cát (2000). Delayed 3 times on 18, 20 & 22 Apr.
25 Apr-4 May	Followed by the playback of Vùng ven một thời con gái (Suburban Women Warriors). The drama was first released on BTV1 channel in 2004. Note: Delayed 2 episode on 28 & 30 Apr.						
6 May	Followed by the playback of 2004 feature film Ký ức Điện Biên (Memory of Điện Biên) in the occasion of Điện Biên Phủ Victory Celebration.						
9-24 May	Cảnh sát hình sự: Lãnh địa đen (Criminal Police: Dark Territory)	10	VFC	Mai Hồng Phong (director); Đặng Phạm Trần (writer); Tuấn Quang, Tùng Dương, Lê Ngọc Quang, Chu Hùng, Đức Tuệ, Tuấn Tú, Thanh Huyền, Đức Trịnh, Bình Xuyên, Phạm Hồng Minh, Lưu Ly, Đỗ Quỳnh Hoa, Quốc Trị, Kim Thủy, Ngọc Dung, Công Vượng, Quốc Hưng, Tuấn Kiên, Hồng Gấm, Lê Tuấn Cường, Chí Tuấn, Đại Dũng...	Những bàn chân lặng lẽ (Quiet Steps) by Thùy Dung	Crime, Drama	Delay 4 eps on 13–14 May, 18–19 May
19 May	Followed by the playback of 2003 feature film Nguyễn Ái Quốc ở Hồng Kông (Nguyễn Ái Quốc in Hongkong) to celebrate Leader Hồ Chí Minh's Birthday.						
25 May-16 Jun	Cảnh sát hình sự: Bí mật những cuộc đời (Criminal Police: The Secrets Behind The Lives)	18	VFC	Nguyễn Hữu Phần, Vũ Hồng Sơn (directors); Nguyễn Như Phong (writer); Nguyễn Hải, Văn Báu, Hồ Tháp, Anh Dũng, Minh Tuấn, Anh Tuấn, Phát Triệu, Thu Trang, Kim Oanh, Hoàng Lan, Văn Thành, Lan Hương 'Bông', Hồng Gấm, Bích Thủy, Duy Thanh, Mai Ngọc Căn, Hồ Phong, Hoàng Mai, Văn Hậu, Văn Bích, Diệu Thủy, Bích Ngọc, Ngọc Thu, Hải Anh, Ngọc Thư, Diệu Hương, Tiến Mộc, Phương Lâm...	Những bàn chân lặng lẽ (Quiet Steps) by Thùy Dung	Crime, Drama	Delay 1 ep on 1 Jun. Adapted from novel of the same name by Nguyễn Như Phong.
17 Jun-21 Jul	Followed by the playback of Hướng nghiệp (Love and Career), 58 episodes (30′), 2 episodes per night. The drama was first released on HTV7 channel in 2004. Note: Delayed 1 ep on 24 Jun.						
22-27 Jul	Bên đường lá đỏ (Red Leaves Sideway)	5	VTV Center in HCMC & BPTV	Trần Vịnh (director); Nguyễn Minh Ngọc (writer); Quang Minh, Nam Cường, Phi Điểu, Xuân Thảo, Quang Mẫn, Cầm Thanh, Đức Hùng, Trường Thịnh, Minh Luân, Kim Loan, Minh Tùng, Sơn Tây, Kha Quốc, Thu Hà, Trương Minh, Thanh Trung, Thu Phương...		War, Drama, Historical	First released on BPTV channel in 2004
28 Jul-1 Aug	Followed by the playback of Thời vi tính (Computer Era), 5 episodes. The drama was first released on HTV9 channel in 2004. Note: Ep 4 airs on Sunday, 31 Jul.						
4-16 Aug	Cảnh sát hình sự: Phi đội chuồn chuồn (Criminal Police: Dragonfly Squadron)	10	VFC	Vũ Minh Trí (director); Vũ Quang Vinh, Phạm Ngọc Tiến (writers); Vũ Phan Anh, Lệ Hằng, Văn Bích, Anh Tuấn, Văn Thành, Trương Thu Hà, Ngọc Dung, Duy Thanh, Quang Ánh, Diệu Hương, Quốc Quân, Trần Đức, Kim Oanh, Tạ Tuấn Minh, Bình Xuyên, Mỹ Duyên, Thùy Liên, Tạ Am, Hữu Độ, Thu Hiền...	Những bàn chân lặng lẽ (Quiet Steps) by Thùy Dung	Crime, Drama	Adapted from the novel of 'Phi đội thuyền nan' by Vũ Quang Vinh
17-18 Aug	Followed by the playback of Hoa trong bão (Flower in the Storm), 2 episodes. The drama was first released on VTV1 channel in 1995.						
19 Aug	Followed by the playback of 2004 feature film Mùa hạ không quên (Unforgettable Summer) to celebrate the August Revolution.						
20 Aug-24 Sep	Ban mai xanh (Green Dawn)	25	VFC and TFS	Trọng Trinh, Như Trang (directors); Phạm Dũng (writer); Minh Tiệp, Phương Điệp, Lý Anh Tuấn, Bích Ngọc, Thanh Quý, Vân Anh, Hương Giang, Đức Tùng, Hồng Hạnh, Cẩm Tú, Quý Hải, Quỳnh Tứ, Trần Thụ, Quý Dương, Hồng Chương, Hữu Độ, Thu Trang, Hải Anh, Phương Khanh, Tuấn Anh, Thành An, Ngọc Quốc, Thu Thủy, Văn Dũng, Quỳnh Trang, Thế Như, Viết Sáu, Quốc Bình, Phương Nhung, Đức Kiên, Ngọc Nam, Trịnh Nhật, Hoài Trang, Tạ Am, Ngọc Quang, Đăng Trinh, Hồng Gấm...	Ban mai xanh (Green Dawn) by Khánh Linh	Romance, Drama	Delay 6 eps on 25-27 Aug, 3 Sep, 6 Sep, 17 Sep.VFC & TFS co-operate in production and distribution. First released on HTV9 on 17 Jun.
26 Sep-12 Oct	Followed by the playback of Nợ đời (Life Debt), 26 episodes (30′), 2 episodes per night. The drama was first released on HTV9 channel in 2004. Note: Delayed 2 times on 30 Sep & 10 Oct.						
13-21 Oct	Followed by the playback of Hàn Mặc Tử, 6 episodes. The drama was first released on HTV7 channel before in the same year. Note: Delayed 2 eps on 14 & 19 Oct.						
25 Oct-2 Nov	Followed by the playback of Nấc thang mới (New Step), 8 episodes. The drama was first released on VTV3 channel in 2003.						
4-11 Nov	Followed by the playback of Bến sông trăng (Moon River Wharf), 13 episodes (30′), 2 episodes per night except the final. The drama was first released on HTV7 channel in 2000.						
12-16 Nov	Tín hiệu bông sen nở (Blooming Lotus Signal)	4	VFC	Lê Cường Việt (director); Hữu Mai (writer); Hoàng Long, Minh Hoàng, Tạ Minh Thảo, Đức Sơn, Hồng Sơn, Quốc Nam, Văn Nghệ, Ngọc Diệp, Cường Việt, Tấn Hưng, Hạnh Thúy, Chí Bửu, Quách Tình, Tấn Lộc, Đoàn Mạnh Dung, Nam Anh, Thanh Tùng, Phúc Hậu, Thành Công, Quốc Quân, Văn Chấn, Nguyễn Hùng, Nguyễn Sa, Trần Lượng, Minh Hường, Ánh Hoa, Ngọc Hương, Cẩm Vân, Thành Châu, Văn Long, Văn Cường...		Intelligence, Crime, Drama	
17 Nov-9 Dec	Followed by the playback of Vị tướng tình báo và hai bà vợ (Intelligence General and His Two Wives), 29 episodes, 2 eps per night. The drama was first released on HTV7 channel in 2003. Note: Delayed 5 times on 19 Nov, 21 Nov, 30 Nov, 1-2 Dec.						
10 Dec 2005- 2 Jan 2006	Lửa than (Coal Fire)	15	VFC	Triệu Tuấn (director); Phạm Văn Quý (writer); Nguyệt Hằng, Kiên Cường, Trần Hạnh, Minh Nguyệt, Quốc Quân, Xuân Tiên, Minh Hiền, Công Dũng, Đàm Hằng, Ngọc Quỳnh, Trần Nhượng, Trần Thụ, Lý Công, Danh Thái, Kim Oanh, Bình Trọng, Ánh Tuyết, Văn Việt, Huyền Thanh...	Mồ hôi mặt trời (Sun Sweat) by Phương Thu	Drama, Political	Delay 4 eps on 19-20 Dec, 24 Dec, 31 Dec

== VTV3 Cinema For Saturday Afternoon dramas ==
These dramas air in early Saturday afternoon on VTV3 with the duration approximately 70 minutes as a part of the program Cinema for Saturday afternoon (Vietnamese: Điện ảnh chiều thứ Bảy).

Broadcast	Title	Eps.	Prod.	Cast and crew	Theme song(s)	Genre	Notes
1-8 Jan	Giai điệu phố (Street Melody)	2		Phạm Hoàng Hà (director & writer); Hồng Quang, Phương Nga, Thanh Nhàn, Tiến Mộc, Duy Khoa, Thúy Anh, Diệu Thuần, Phạm Đức Tuệ, Xuân Bình, Quang Thiện, Chí Cường, Quang Thắng, Xuân Dương...	Giữ mãi tiếng đàn (Keep The Sound Forever) by Lệ Quyên	Drama, Romance, Musical	
15-22 Jan	Chuyện đã qua (A Story That Was Over)	2	VFS	Nguyễn Hữu Đức, Đào Duy Phúc (directors); Trần Quốc Lân (writer); Bá Anh, Thu Hạnh, Thu Hường, Kiều Minh Hiếu, Trần Thụ, Khôi Nguyên, Ngọc Trung, Cao Thắng, Phương Lâm, Cao Nga, Đinh Thanh Hà, Nguyễn Thị Ngọc, Nguyễn Mạnh Tuấn, Ngô Thị Dung...		Drama, Marriage	
29 Jan-5 Feb	Ngôi nhà cũ (The Old House)	2		Bạch Diệp (director); Thanh Tâm (writer); Minh Châu, Trung Anh, Thế Tục, Ngọc Thoa, Tăng Nhật Tuệ, Bùi Như Lai, Thanh Tú, Trần Đức, Đức Khuê, Đình Chiến, Nguyễn Thu Hà, Phạm Hà Duy, Lan Minh, Hồng Chương, Quốc Thắng, Tuấn Khải, Sandy Infield, Thu Hà, Thái Duy, Mai Phương, Ngọc Quân, Ngọc Diệp, Thái Hà, Thủy Duy, Mạnh Tuấn, Huyền Nga, Bích Ngọc, Tuấn Tú, Kim Chi, Thùy Linh, students of Đại Mỗ High School and Phạm Hồng Thái High School...	Jinsei Madamada Agedaman by Kaori Futenma	Drama, Family, Artistic	
12-19 Feb	Cô dâu Việt (Vietnamese Bride)	2		Nguyễn Quang, Đoàn Anh Dũng (directors); Nguyễn Lê Thủy (writer); Thùy Dung, Kim Oanh, Như Quỳnh, Nguyễn Quang, Đức Khuê, Bá Anh, Thu Huyền, Quang Ánh, Hoàng Yến, Hoàng Mai, Đức Long, Minh Liên, Nam Sơn...	Phố hẹn (The Road of Promise) by Tuấn Hùng	Family, Marriage, Comedy	Airs as a Tet drama.
26 Feb-5 Mar	Chuyện không riêng của trẻ con (Not Just A Kid's Story)	2 (70′)	Giải Phóng Film	Nguyễn Duy Võ Ngọc (director); Nguyễn Đức Anh (writer); Mai Huỳnh, Trịnh Kim Chi, Hoàng Quan Nhân, Phạm Khương Thịnh, Cao Thị Xuân Hòa, Gia Hân, Dương Công Khá, Tăng Bảo Quyên, Hoàng Phúc Thắng, Mai Thành, Hồ Hoàng Trúc...		Drama, Children, Scholastic, Family	
12-19 Mar	Một tuần và một lần (A Week And A Time)	2		Nguyễn Hữu Ứng (director); Nguyễn Toàn Thắng (writer); Bảo Quý, Minh Phương, Khánh Băng, Hoàng Minh, Quốc Huy, Hoàng Mai, Đạt Hiển, Bảo Khiêm, Thu Thủy, Lê Na, Dịu Hương, Thanh Huyền, Quỳnh Giang, Khánh Lộc, Đức Long, Nguyễn Thị Nguyệt, Mậu Hòa, Kim Thanh, Bích Hòa, Minh Hằng, Vân Chi, Kim Tín, Hồng Đăng, Thế Hùng, Bá Cường, Kim Xuyến, Đỗ Thao, Mạnh Linh, Hoàng Dũng, Đăng Vân, Mạnh Hiệp, Thu An....	Dream Shift by SILK Chikyu Boueigumi Ouenka by Rica Matsumoto, Rie Iwasubo, Mari Maruta, Konami Yoshida, Mami Matsui and Saori Sugimoto	Drama, Scholastic, Youth	
26 Mar-2 Apr	Con đường khát (Dreamy Path)	2		Thế Vinh, Trần Hùng (director); Nguyễn Thu Dung (writer); Kiều Anh, Xuân Tùng, Diệu Thuần, Phương Thanh, Trần Thụ, Thanh Chi, Khôi Nguyên, Hồng Quang, Vũ Phan Anh, Lan Phương, Thu Hương...	With The Help of God, Shine; Composed by David Helfgott and Ricky Edwards	Drama, Marriage	
9-16 Apr	Nỗi nhớ nguồn cội (Nostalgia for the Root)	2				Drama	
23 Apr-21 May	Người trong gia đình (Family Members)	5 (75′)	Giải Phóng Film	Lê Hữu Lương (director); Đặng Thanh Bình (writer); Thùy Liên, Mạnh Dung, Thanh Thúy, Kim Tiểu Long, Trung Dũng, Uyên Trinh, Hồng Lễ, Thùy Dương, San Tú, Hồng Phú Vinh, Nguyên Sa, Thanh Nguyên, Lê Chuẩn, Nguyễn Thúy Kiều, Lý Đặng Kiều Trinh, Vũ Thanh Hà...	Thương lắm tóc dài ơi! (Sympathy For The Laborious Woman) by Lê Dung	Family, Drama	
28 May-18 Jun	Miền đồi ấm áp (Warmish Hills)	4		Nguyễn Hữu Luyện, Duy Thanh (directors); Nguyễn Xuân Hải (writer); Hồng Sơn, Trần Hạnh, Thanh Hiền, Duy Thanh, Thu Hường, Hoàng Mai, Anh Tuấn, Xuân Trình, Thùy Linh, Việt Tùng, Đức Thắng, Hồng Thêu, Đảm Hằng, Ngọc Hoa, Hương Trang, Hoàng Yến, Ánh Thiệp, Văn Bộ, Minh Nguyệt, Kim Phụng, Đức Lợi, Hồng Hải, Ngọc Tản, Mạnh Hùng, Diệu Linh, Nguyệt Hằng, Minh Phương, Quốc Quân, Bích Thủy, Thùy Dung, Hồng Liên, Duy Hùng, Phong Tỉnh, Hồng Nhung, Hương Lan, Tin Tin, Hồng Loan...	Merry-go-Round of Life; Composed by Joe Hisaishi	Drama, Slice-of-Life, Psychological, Crime	
25 Jun-17 Sep	Vượt qua thử thách (Overcoming Challenges)	26 (35′)	Feature Film Studio I	Phi Tiến Sơn, Nguyễn Hữu Luyện, Trịnh Lê Phong (directors); Nguyễn Thành Phong, Trung Trung Ðỉnh (writers); Hồng Quang, Duy Hậu, Hoàng Dũng, Quốc Tuấn, Bích Ngọc, Ngọc Dung, Tuấn Quang, Như Quỳnh, Duy Thanh, Lê Quốc Thắng, Minh Phương, Lâm Tùng, Đỗ Kỷ, Minh Tuấn, Phú Đôn, Đình Chiến, Anh Phương, Công Bảy, Kim Hoàn, Tiến Thu, Danh Thái, Hồ Phong, Hải Anh, Quốc Thành, Thu Phương, Đức Bình, Mạnh Tuấn, Đức Minh, Diệu Trang, Kim Huyền, Ngọc Khánh, Bích Thủy, Nguyễn Hùng, Trần Lâm, Thanh Hải, Nhân Hậu...		Drama, Crime, Propaganda	Airs 2 episodes each time. Ordered by Committee for Population, Family and Children.
24 Sep-1 Oct	Bố ơi... (Daddy!)	2 (75′)	VFS	Đào Duy Phúc (director); Hà Anh Thu (writer); Viết Liên, Đào Thanh Duyên, Chu Quỳnh Trang, Hoàng Yến, Nguyễn Cẩm Nhung, Nguyễn Văn Chung, Phạm Quyết Chiến, Nam Cường, Đức Hải, Khôi Nguyên, Nguyễn Thị Vân, Nguyễn Đức...		Melodrama, Family	Based on a true story
8-15 Oct	Minh Nguyệt	2 (75′)	Hodafilm	Nguyễn Hữu Phần (director); Học Phi (writer); Tiến Hợi, Lâm Tùng, Mai Thu Huyền, Bạch Diện, Hoa Thúy, Ngọc Tản, Xuân Trường, Xuân Tình, Antoine Vilars, Trần Đức, Thanh Vân, Cường Việt, Huỳnh Phương, Duy Minh, Ngọc Linh, Tuấn Anh, Văn Tuấn, Trần Thông, Mạnh Hùng, Minh Hải, Ngọc Tuấn, Duy Mạnh, Khánh Sơn, Nicola...	Mười chín tháng Tám (The Nineteenth of August) by VOV orchestra and choir Ba Đình nắng (Ba Đình in Sunshine) by The choir of Air Force-Air Defense artistic troupe	Historical, Drama	Adapted from short story of the same name by Học Phi. Produced to celebrate 51 Years of Hanoi Liberation.
22-29 Oct	Tia chớp (Lightning)	2 (70′)		Vũ Đình Thân (director & writer); Hoàng Mai, Việt Thắng, Vũ Phan Anh, Đỗ Quỳnh Hoa, Hải Hòa, Phương Anh, Kim Thoa, Thu Hiền, Hồng Hải, Ngọc Hân, Thanh Nga, Quang Long, Toàn Thổ, Tiến Dũng, Trần Hùng, Phan Kha, Minh Toản, Hà Mùi, Minh Nguyệt...	Romeo & Juliet: Aimer; Composed by André Rieu La Vie est Belle; Composed by André Rieu	Drama, Romance	
5-12 Nov	Em tôi (My Younger Sibling)	2		Vũ Xuân Hưng (director); Liên Phương (writer); Đức Sơn, Quế Hằng, Nguyễn Thanh Hương, Nguyễn Minh Thanh, Phương Thanh, Nguyễn Thanh Thủy, Nguyễn Ngọc Thái Duy, Duy Anh, Chu Thanh Thủy, Trần Quốc Hùng, Nguyễn Văn Hiển, Nguyễn Văn Thúc, Lý Tuyết Nhung, Hồng Chương, Trần Văn Long...	Soshite Mirai wa Composed by Hayato Matsuo Panic in Gochonai no Minasan; Composed by Tomoki Hasegawa (episode 1) Moshimo Anata ni Awanakereba (Instrumental Version); Composed by Yasunori Iwasaki (episode 2)	Drama, Children, Slice-of-Life	Adapted from short story 'Chuyện trẻ con' by Chu Diệu Quyên
19-26 Nov	Xóm gà trống (Hamlet of Roosters)	2		Nguyễn Danh Sơn (director); Trần Thị Thanh Hồng (writer); Trần Hạnh, Phú Đôn, Đức Khuê, Thu Hiền, Đỗ Quỳnh Hoa, Tấn Nam, Thanh Hương, Thanh Giang, Văn Báu, Thanh Hiền, Văn Sơn, Hồng Hải, Văn Nghị, Trần Thị Mùi, Danh Nhân, Ngân Phương, Thúy Ngọc, Thu Giang, Kiên Cường...	Arashi no Hero by Yuzuru Oka	Comedy, Romance, Rural, Slice-of-Life	
3 Dec	Chuyện của chúng mình (The Story of Us)	1				Drama	
10 Dec 2005- 11 Feb 2006	Đời chè (The Life With Tea)	10	Đông A Pictures	Trần Lực, Đặng Thu Trang (directors); Thiên Phúc (writer); Tuấn Tú, Hoàng Xuân, Hoàng Mai, Trung Anh, Trọng Trinh, Hồng Quân, Thanh An, Hữu Độ, Thanh Tùng, Đắc Trung...	'Đời chè' theme song by Trần Thu Hà	Drama, Rural, Political, Business	

== VTV3 Sunday Literature & Art dramas ==
These dramas air in early Sunday afternoon on VTV3 as a part of the program Sunday Literature & Art (Vietnamese: Văn nghệ Chủ Nhật).

Broadcast	Title	Eps.	Prod.	Cast and crew	Theme song(s)	Genre	Notes
9 Jan	Những chuyến đò ngang (A Pedagogical Story)	1 (80′)	VFC	Triệu Tuấn (director); Lương Xuân Thủy (writer); Thu Hằng, Hải Anh, Hải Yến, Mai Hòa, Phương Anh, Đức Hải, Tiến Mộc, Minh Tâm, Đặng Trung, Hoàng Mai, Minh Hằng, Duy Anh, Tạ Am, Minh Nguyệt, Trần Quỳnh, Kim Ánh, Nguyên Cương, Quang Chính, Thanh Cầm, Kim Hoa, Đức Thắng, Đào Liên, Trọng Văn...	'Những chuyến đò ngang' theme song by Minh Thúy	Scholastic, Drama	
16 Jan	Mười hai cửa bể (Ocean of Misery)	1 (80′)	VFC	Nguyễn Hữu Phần (director); Trần Anh Đào (writer); Phương Mai, Lý Thanh Kha, Vũ Phan Anh, Thu Quế, Anh Tuấn, Đức Thuận, Huyền Thanh, Giang Châu, Thanh Thanh, Đình Chiến, Hương Anh, Kim Oanh, Thanh Hà, Minh Tuấn, Văn Vượng, Nguyễn Yến...	'Mười hai cửa bể' theme song by Phương Anh	Drama, Romance	Adapted from short story of the same name by Lý Biên Cương
23 Jan-13 Mar	Bản lĩnh người đẹp (Beauty's Bravery)	8 (70′)	VFC	Nguyễn Anh Tuấn (director); Yên Thế (writer); Nguyễn Thanh Mai, Việt Anh, Phú Thăng, Thanh Chi, Đường Minh Giang, Thành An, Phát Triệu, Tuyết Liên, Mai Nguyên, Ngọc Hân, Minh Hiền, Nguyễn Thanh Trà, Kim Xuyến, Chu Hùng, Khôi Nguyên, Lệ Quyên, Nguyễn Minh Tuân, Mai Khanh, Xuân Hậu, Hồng Quang, Duy Thanh, Phương Hạnh, Hải Yến, Kim Hoàn, Việt Bắc, Minh Phương, Nam Cường, Tiến Hải, Huyền Sâm, Trần Hà, Xuân Đồng, Nguyễn Thu Hà, Kim Thêu, Quốc Tiến, Lương Bình, Tuyết Nhung, Văn Bích, Tuệ Trinh...		Romance, Drama	
20 Mar-12 Jun	Dòng sông phẳng lặng (The Calm River)	13 (70′)	VFC and TRT	Đỗ Đức Thành (director); Lưu Nghiệp Quỳnh (writer); Diễm Lộc, Hoàng Hải, Hồng Sơn, Hương Dung, Thu Quế, Kiều Thanh, Đàm Hằng, Tạ Minh Thảo, Việt Anh, Lệ Huyền, Tùng Dương, Huy Trinh, Minh Hải, Nguyễn Thị Hiền, Văn Hùng, Thế Lân, Bách Thủy, Trương Tuấn Hải, Minh Tấu, Nguyễn Chương, Đoàn Trọng Thể, Ngô Thế Tuệ, Văn Huyến...	Dòng sông phẳng lặng (The Calm River) by Mỹ Linh	Historical, Drama, War	Adapted from the novel of the same name by Tô Nhuận Vỹ
19 Jun-10 Jul	Chuyện tình vùng quê (Rural Love Story)	4 (80′)	VFC	Lê Cường Việt (director); Đoàn Trúc Quỳnh (writer); Hồng Sơn, Minh Phương, Hồng Điệp, Tạ Minh Thảo, Thùy Hương, Duy Thanh, Thanh Hải, Ngọc Bích, Tiến Mộc, Quang Vịnh, Hương Anh, Thanh Tùng, Lan Minh, Tạ Am, Thế Dương, Kim Tin, Thái An, Phương Lâm, Trần Hạnh, Thiếu Ngân, Thanh Giang, Phương Loan, Khôi Nguyên, Minh Tản, Văn Tiến, Minh Đức, Nam Cường, Hồng Gấm...	'Chuyện tình vùng quê' theme song by Trọng Tấn	Rural, Romance, Drama	Adapted from the novel of 'Chuyện tình ven biển' by Phạm Ngọc Hưng
17 Jul-14 Aug	Cầu Trầm (Trầm Bridge)	5	VFC	Duy Thanh, Nguyễn Hải...		Drama, Crime	
21 Aug-25 Sep	Tia nắng mong manh (Fragile Sunlight)	6 (80′)	VFC	Bạch Diệp (director & writer); Chiều Xuân, Trung Anh, Mai Thu Huyền, Ngọc Thoa, Tiến Đạt, Vũ Phan Anh, Lan Anh, Phương Minh, Hương Dung, Lê Mai, Anh Thái, Hữu Độ, Khôi Nguyên, Trần Dũng, Trần Thụ, Bảo Anh...	'Tia nắng mong manh' opening song by Hà Vy 'Tia nắng mong manh' ending song by Kiều Vân	Drama, Family	Adapted from novel of the same name by Hoàng Ngọc Hà
2 Oct-20 Nov	Con đường gian khổ (A Path of Hardship)	8 (60′)	VFC	Nguyễn Hữu Phần (director); Lâm Quang Ngọc (writer); Khôi Nguyên, Hoa Thúy, Lâm Tùng, Việt Anh, Tiến Hợi, Thanh Hiền, Phú Thăng, Văn Thành, Doãn Hoàng Kiên, Kim Hoàn, Mai Ngọc Căn, Kim Oanh, Tạ Am, Đức Mẫn, Trần Thụ, Phương Anh, Duy Khoa, Kim Yến, Hoàng Mai, Hoàng Lâm, Thương An, Đức Tân, Nguyễn Thu Hà, Duy Anh, Thu Trang, Thu Hương, Duy Linh...	'Con đường gian khổ' theme song by Minh Thu	Drama, Romance, Political, Scholastic, Rural	
27 Nov 2005- 2 Apr 2006	Hương đất (Scent of the Soil)	18 (70′)	VFC	Trần Quốc Trọng (director); Vân Thảo (writer); Mai Hoa, Lan Hương 'Bông', Bùi Bài Bình, Dũng Nhi, Đỗ Kỷ, Nguyễn Thu Hà, Bạch Diện, Thùy Liên, Tô Kim Phụng, Phạm Dương, Văn Báu, Thanh Giang, Hà Văn Cầu, Phương Mai, Mai Ngọc Căn, Quốc Hùng, Bảo Thanh, Xuân Quế, Văn Trinh, Trần Thông, Hồng Tĩnh, Kim Cúc, Phương Thảo, Thúy Ngân, Hoàng Tùng, Thu Cúc, Việt Trường, Nguyễn Trang, Bình Dương, Hồng Chương, Phương Điệp, Bích Vân, Trần Quốc Trọng...	Hương đất (The Scent of the Soil) by Mai Hoa and the choir of Sơn Ca	Rural, Drama	

== See also ==
- List of dramas broadcast by Vietnam Television (VTV)
- List of dramas broadcast by Hanoi Radio Television (HanoiTV)
- List of dramas broadcast by Vietnam Digital Television (VTC)
