= List of VTV dramas broadcast in 2002 =

This is a list of VTV dramas released in 2002.

←2001 - 2002 - 2003→

== VTV Tet dramas ==
These films air on VTV channels during Tet holiday.

=== VTV1 ===
Broadcast	Title	Eps.	Prod.	Cast and crew	Theme song(s)	Genre	Notes
11 Feb	Những người đã hết thời (Has-been People)	1 (75′)	VTV Film Prod.	Bùi Huy Thuần (director); Đỗ Trí Hùng (writer); Nguyễn Bá Cường, Hà Văn Trọng, Thành An, Thanh Hiền, Mỹ Linh, Trần Hạnh, Tạ Minh Thảo, Lý Công...		Drama, Post-war	Airs 16:30, 30th Tet holiday
11 Feb	Mừng tuổi (Giving Lucky Money)	1	VTV Film Prod.	Trọng Trinh (director); Đỗ Anh Duy (writer); Sơn Tùng, Phan Nhân, Mai Hòa, Thúy Hà, Ngọc Quang, Huyền Thanh, Lâm Dung, Thu Hà, Phú Đôn, Tất Đạt...		Children, Drama, Slice-of-Life	Airs 22:00, 30th Tet holiday.
12 Feb	Cất nước sông quê (Rural River Paddling)	1	VTV Film Prod.	Đỗ Chí Hướng (director); Đỗ Hồng Ngọc (writer); Kiều Anh, Kiều Minh Hiếu...	Love Love Minky Momo by Mami Koyama Lum's Love Song by Yuko Matsutani	Romance, Drama	Airs 06:30, 1st Tet holiday. Based on the short story "Người về cất nước sông Gianh" by Đỗ Tiến Thuy.
13 Feb	Người quê (Country People)	1	VTV Film Prod.	Vũ Minh Trí (director); Ngân Hà (writer)		Family, Drama	Airs 10:00, 2nd Tet holiday. Based on Nguyễn Hữu Nhàn's short story of the same name.
13 Feb	Điện hoa (Flower Delivery)	1 (60′)	VTV Film Prod.	Vũ Trường Khoa (director); Võ Khắc Nghiêm (writer); Võ Hoài Nam, Thanh Vân, Quang Đài, Ngọc Tản, Phan Ánh Tuyết, Trần Tuế, Quang Việt, Lê Mai, Đan Thùy, Thu Hà, Minh Lượng, Thanh Hằng, Thúy Nga...		Romance, Drama	Airs 21:30, 2nd Tet holiday
14 Feb	Mã số thần kỳ (Magical Code)	1	VTV Film Prod.	Mạc Văn Chung (director); Trịnh Thanh Nhã (writer)		Drama, Fantasy	Airs 10:00, 3rd Tet holiday

=== VTV3 ===
Broadcast	Title	Eps.	Prod.	Cast and crew	Theme song(s)	Genre	Notes
12 Feb	Câu chuyện quanh trái bóng (All About Football)	1 (65′)	VTV Film Prod.	Trần Hoài Sơn (director); Đoàn Tuấn (writer); Trần Tiệp, Văn Toản, Tuấn Minh, Trần Quốc Trọng, Công Lý, Thu Hương, Mỹ Linh, Như Lai, Đức Khuê, Thành Hưng, Khôi Nguyên, Danh Dũng, Thế Long, Duy Hùng...		Comedy, Sport	Airs 07:30, 1st Tet holiday
14 Feb	Trời cho - Trò chơi (Easy Money)	1 (80′)	VTV Film Prod.	Nguyễn Anh Tuấn (director); Đặng Huy Quyển (writer); Văn Toản, Ngọc Tuyết, Thu Hương, Xuân Bắc, Thành Thái, Diễm Hằng, Tiến Mộc, Văn Hiệp, Quang Thắng, Nguyễn Bá Cường, Trọng Cường, Công Dũng, Mỹ Duyên, Đặng Huy Quyển, J. Như, Trần Hạnh, Bá Tiện, Phương Khanh, Kim Bình, Minh Đức, Ngân Phương, Hồng Loan, Minh Quân ...		Rural, Comedy, Drama	Airs 07:30, 3rd Tet holiday.

== VTV1 Monday night dramas ==
These dramas air in every Monday night from 21:00 to 22:00 on VTV1.

Note:
- Unlisted airtime periods were spent for special events.
- Starting from February, the Sunday night time slot, which was for foreign dramas, turned into a new time slot called Weekend Film (Vietnamese: Phim cuối tuần). It started with the playback of single-episode drama Vì một ngày mai (For a Future), first aired on BTV1, but was followed mainly by foreign feature films after.
- From October to December, the time slots was changed into Monday to Wednesday for foreign dramas and Thursday & Friday for Vietnamese dramas. This is only for the drama Đất và người. After the final episode was delayed on Friday, 27 December due to a special event, it was moved to Monday, 30 December. The time slot was changed back since then.

Broadcast	Title	Eps.	Prod.	Cast and crew	Theme song(s)	Genre	Notes
18 Feb-4 Mar	Xuôi ngược đường trần (Up and Down the Dust Way)	3	VTV Film Prod.	Nguyễn Anh Tuấn, Linh Nga (directors); Linh Nga, Đặng Huy Quyển (writers); Linh Nga, Hoàng Công, Thế Tục, Kim Xuyến, Mai Ngọc Căn, Hùng Bống, Ngọc Dung, Lê Hiếu, Thu Hà, Tâm Cường, Lê Văn, Duy Linh, Ngọc Tản, Mai Phương, Đức Anh, Nam Cường, Mai Hạnh...		Drama, Slice-of-Life, Religious	
11-18 Mar	Dòng sông vẫn trôi (River's Still Running)	2	Tây Đô Film Prod.	Xuân Cường (director); Phạm Thùy Nhân (writer); Việt Trinh, Chi Bảo, Lê Quang, Ngọc Minh, Kim Loan, Thanh Tâm, Tiết Cương, Phi Vân, Thành Lũy, Nguyễn Đình Thơ, Thanh Thủy, Thiên Lộc, Thụy Vũ...		Drama, Historical	Based on a story of the same name by Nguyễn Đức Thiện. First released on CTV.
25 Mar	Followed by the playback of Chuột (The Rat). The single-episode drama was first released on HTV9 channel in 2001.						
2 Apr	Followed by the playback of Chim bìm bịp (The Coucal). The single-episode drama was first released on THP channel earlier this year.						
8 Apr-13 May	Làng ven hồ (Lakeside Village)	5	VTV Film Prod.	Trần Quốc Trọng (director); Nguyễn Quyến (writer); Nguyễn Văn Bộ, Hoàng Hải, Mỹ Duyên, Thanh Hà, Diễm Lộc, Lý Thanh Kha, Đình Chiến, Quốc Trọng, Vân Anh, Đức Hòa, Đức Quân, Văn Thái, Việt Bắc, Phương Loan, Văn Trung, Mỹ Huyền, Gia Khoản, Đàm Phõ, Văn Cường, Nhật Ánh, Thanh Nhàn, Kim Phụng...		Rural, Drama	Delayed 1 ep on 29 Apr. Based on the novel 'Câu chuyện bên hồ' by Nguyễn Anh Đào.
1 May	Một ngày của tổ trưởng (One Day Of The Leader)	1 (70′)	VTV Film Prod.	Trịnh Lê Phong (director); Đoàn Trúc Quỳnh (writer); Trịnh Quốc Thư, Diễm Lộc, Sỹ Tiến, Quốc Long, Như Lai, Tùng Thúy, Hồng Quân, Tuấn Dương, Kim Oanh, Nguyễn Chung, Ngọc Tuyết, Hoàng Thụ, Quốc Thái...		Slice-of-Life	Airs on Wed, 1 May (instead of Mon, 29 Apr) to celebrate Labor Day
20 May-3 Jun	Nợ đồng lần (Eventual Debt)	3	VTV Film Prod.	Trọng Liên (director); Trần Danh (writer); Xuân Thảo, Danh Sơn, Ngọc Dung, Văn Thiện, Công Dũng, Mỹ Duyên, Lê Hải, Bá Cường, Văn Toản, Hương Dung, Hồng Vân, Cẩm Thúy, Phú Dương, Hoàng Hùng, Ngọc Trang, Công Bắc, Thanh Tĩnh, Huy Bình, Ngọc Thanh, Thu Hoài, Thanh Huyền, Trần Biên, Thùy Dương, Đình Chính...		Drama, Marriage	Based on short story of the same name by Lê Duy Hòa
10 Jun	Rác phố (Trash on the Street)	1 (98′)	TĐN	Lê Ngọc Linh (director); Vũ Lâm (writer); Thu Hương, Hùng Khanh, Hoàng Hải, Lê Nga, Bích Trâm, Công Nghĩa, Minh Bá, Kim Dung, Như Dư, Minh Hiệp, Ngọc Thủy, Mạnh Thìn, Hà Minh, Thu Hiến, Văn Chi, Như Bình, Thanh Hải, Thùy Linh, Quốc Quyền, Bích Phượng, Ly Lan, Đình Dũng, Tiến Đạt, Ngọc Rua, Viết Quang, Tô Kỳ, Quốc Công, Thanh Quảng, Ngọc Hưng, Đăng Thanh, Văn Huỳnh, Minh Lễ, Đức Hải, Thanh Nga, Minh Hằng, Văn Nghĩa, Đức Tiến, Quý Đông...		Drama	
17 Jun	Trăng nước ngũ hồ (Watery Moon and Five Lakes)	1	VTV Film Prod.	Bạch Diệp (director), Trịnh Thanh Nhã (writer); Minh Châu, Max Hart, Mạnh Cường, Sỹ Tiến, Lê Thế Tục, Trần Việt Hà, Đức Thuận, Duy Thanh, Ngọc Căn, Lan Hương, Đức Khuê, Thế Bình, Kiều Thanh, Kim Oanh, Văn Huy, Quốc Tùng, Văn Tính, Thiện Kiến...		Drama, Political, Rural	
24 Jun-30 Sep	Followed by the playback of Gió qua miền tối sáng (Wind Through the Dark and Light), 30 episodes. The drama was first released on VTV1 channel in 1998. *Note: Airs 2 episodes per night from 15 Jul to 23 Sep (episode 10 to 27), 3 episodes per night on the other days. Delay 2 times on 19 Aug and 2 Sep.						
19 Aug	Followed by the playback of Con của sông Dinh (The Son of Dinh River). The single-episode drama was first released in 2000.						
1-3 Sep	Những ngày vẫn có mặt trời (Days With Sun Still Above)	4	VTV Center in HCMC	Trần Vịnh (director); Lê Minh...		Historical, War, Drama	Airs 3 days in a row to celebrate the National Day (2 Sep)
10 Oct-30 Dec	Đất và người (The Land and the People)	24	VTV Film Prod.	Nguyễn Hữu Phần, Phạm Thanh Phong (directors); Khuất Quang Thụy (writer); Duy Hậu, Hán Văn Tình, Phát Triệu, Duy Thanh, Hà Văn Trọng, Minh Phương, Phạm Hồng Minh, Thanh Giang, Mạnh Tuấn, Hồng Chương, Nam Cường, Hồ Quốc Phong, Trần Duy Hùng, Như Lai, Hà Hoàng Hiệp, Thành An, Phú Đôn, Tuấn Dương, Mai Ngọc Căn, Đại Mý, Kim Hoàn, Hương Ly, Thái An, Quang Thắng, Hồ Liên, Văn Chung, Chu Hùng, Vi Cầm...	Đất và người (The Land and the People) by Mai Hoa	Rural, Drama, Period	Adapted from the novel 'Mảnh đất lắm người nhiều ma' by Nguyễn Khắc Trường

== VTV3 Cinema For Saturday Afternoon dramas ==
These dramas air in early Saturday afternoon on VTV3 with the duration approximately 70 minutes as a part of the program Cinema for Saturday afternoon (Vietnamese: Điện ảnh chiều thứ Bảy).

- Note: The time slot was delayed 2 weeks (on 1 & 8 Jun) due to the broadcast schedule for 2002 FIFA World Cup.

Broadcast	Title	Eps.	Prod.	Cast and crew	Theme song(s)	Genre	Notes
5 Jan	Một chuyến vi hành (An Incognito Travel)	1 (65′)		Lê Thành (director); Thiên Phúc (writer); Nam Cường, Trần Hà, Công Lý, Thanh Lâm, Xuân Tăng, Thanh Dũng, Quang Đồng, Kim Hồng, Đặng Linh, Bích Thủy, Anh Túc, Mỹ Bình, Ngọc Linh...		Comedy, Drama, Adventure	
12-19 Jan	Trang cuối một tình yêu (Last Page of a Love)	2		Nguyễn Huy Hoàng (director); Đoàn Trúc Quỳnh (writer); Hữu Độ, Quế Hằng, Phương Thảo, Minh Đức, Hòa Vang, Anh Dũng, Kim Xuyến, Kim Hoàn, Quốc Phong, Hải Yến, Hoàng Tùng, Thu Hà, Bích Diệp, Phú Toàn, Trần Tùng, Nguyễn Hưng, Mạnh Cường, Hồng Ánh, Thùy Hương, Xuân Tỉnh...	Giọt sương và tia nắng (Dewdrop and Sunbeam) by Vân Anh	Drama, Romance	Based on a short story of the same name by Nguyễn Lê
26 Jan	Người muôn năm cũ (Person Of The Old Time)	1		Nguyễn Hữu Luyện (director & writer); Ngọc Hoa, Hoàng Xuân...		Drama, Romance	Adapted from short story of the same name by Bão Vũ
2-16 Feb	Bão rừng (Storm in the Woods)	3	Giải Phóng Film	Trần Ngọc Phong (director); Phạm Thùy Nhân (writer); Thanh Thúy, Trọng Hải, Kim Phượng, Nguyễn Hoàng, Bích Huyền, Phương Bằng, Hoàng Nhân, Ngọc Phong, Mai Trần, Thành Công, Trần Lượng, Lâm Thế Thành, Nguyễn Tâm, Thanh Hoài, Mạnh Dung, Hạnh Năm, Văn Hùng...	'Bão rừng' theme song	Drama	
23 Feb-2 Mar	Khúc dạo đầu (Prelude)	2		Nguyễn Quang (director); Trần Kim Thanh (writer); Hồng Quang, Thanh Hằng, Hoàng Xuân, Công Dũng, Phương Nhi, Thanh Phúc, Hoàng Dũng, Trần Thạch, Thúy Phương, Đức Trịnh, Trịnh Tín, Kim Ngân, Xuân Tùng, Hồng Tuấn, Mỹ Anh, Vân Hồng, Lâm Tùng, Quốc Thái, Tạ Thu, Diệu Thuận, Duy Minh, Trọng Hà, Nguyễn Yến, Trung Kiên...	Umi no Mieru Machi; Composed by Joe Hisaishi	Drama, Romance, Coming-of-Age, Crime	
9 Mar	Mùa cưới (Wedding Season)	1		Đỗ Minh Tuấn (director); Nguyễn Thị Vân (writer); Mai Ngọc Căn, Thanh Hiền, Thu Hà, Phú Đôn, Vân Anh...		Comedy	
16-23 Mar	Nhà có cánh cổng sắt (House With the Iron Gate)	2		Nguyễn Anh Dũng (director); Dương Nữ Khánh Thương (writer); Trung Anh, Lan Anh, Kiều Thanh, Phương Thảo, Phương Lâm, Trịnh Mai Nguyên, Lâm Tùng, Tuấn Long...		Family, Drama	
30 Mar	Hoa xương rồng (Cactus Flower)	1		Nguyễn Hữu Luyện (director & writer); Như Quỳnh, Đức Khuê, Vũ Phạm Từ, Quỳnh Châu, Bá Cường, Hương Dung...		Drama, Family, Slice-of-Life	Based on novel of the same name by Nguyễn Quang Thiều
6-13 Apr	Trại ven sông (Riverside Neighborhood)	2		Đào Phương Liên, Phạm Khánh Cao (writers); Bích Ngọc, Trần Thạch, Mai Hoa, Hồng Quang, Mỹ Linh, Ngọc Tản, Bích Diệp...		Romance, Drama	
20 Apr	Nghỉ hè ra phố (Summer Break in Downtown)	1	VFS	Đào Duy Phúc (director); Ngô Phương Hạnh (writer); Hồng Chương...		Children, Slice-of-Life	
27 Apr-18 May	Khỏa nước sông Quy (Paddling on Quy River)	4		Trần Vinh (director); Nguyễn Thanh Phong (writer); Yến Vy, Tấn Hùng, Hoàng Khiêm, Đường Minh Giang, Hồng Chương, Thanh Thủy, Hồng Điệp...		Drama, Romance, Ethnic	Adapted from the novel of 'Hoa mận đỏ' by Cao Duy Sơn
25 May	Đứa con vùng đồi (Children of the Hills)	1		Trần Trung Dũng (director); Nguyễn Quang Thiều (writer); Quốc Trị, Phạm Minh Nguyệt, Bảo Thanh, Nguyễn Văn Kiên...		Drama, Marriage, Family	
15-22 Jun	Đêm ba canh (The Night With Three Chapters)	2		Khuất Thị Vân Huyền (writer); Lương Thị Nga, Đỗ Đức Trung, Tạ Minh Thảo, Ngọc Hoa, Văn Bộ, Minh Nguyệt, Thanh Quang, Nguyễn Thị Xuân...		Drama	
29 Jun	Ông thần cây đa (The Banyan God)	1		Lê Thanh (director); Vũ Lê Mai (writer); Đặng Trần Quỳnh, Duy Khánh, Trần Hà, Khánh Vân, Mạnh Tường, Thái Vân...		Drama, Fantasy	
6 Jul	Bí kíp học đường (School Tricks)	1		Trịnh Lê Phong (directors); Nguyễn Long Khánh (writer)		Scholastic, Drama	
13-20 Jul	Followed by the playback of Những kẻ giấu mặt (The Hidden Faces) to celebrate Traditional Day of People's Police Force (20 Jul). The drama was first released also in Cinema For Saturday Afternoon in Mar 2001.						
27 Jul	Không chỉ là màu đen (Not Just Black)	1 (70′)		Tuấn Quang, Như Trang, Quang Minh, Hải Việt, Hương Ly, Bắc Việt, Quốc Hùng, Lan Phương, Hoàng Thanh Giang, Mỹ Dung...		Drama	
3-10 Aug	Quỳnh Chi và Lệ Chi (Quỳnh Chi and Lệ Chi)	2		Cao Mạnh (director); Nguyễn Anh Dũng (writer); Hoa Thúy, Quách Thu Phương, Xuân Tùng, Đức Khuê, Hà Văn Trọng, Hồng Thu, Phát Triệu, Tuyết Mai, Minh Quốc, Ngọc Thoa, Đức Trung, Văn Toản, Trung Kiền, Thanh Tùng, Thanh Vân, Hồng Vân, Bích Thủy, Hoàng Lan, Bích Ngọc...		Romance, Drama	
17 Aug	Cha và con (A Father And His Child)	1	Feature Film Studio I	Phạm Thùy Nhân (writer); Thanh Quý		Drama, Slice-of-Life	
24-31 Aug	Điệp vụ thứ nhất (The First Mission)	2 (70′)	People's Police Film Prod.	Nguyễn Quang, Tú Mai (directors); Trường Thanh (writer); Quách Thu Phương, Paul Huelz de Lemps, Lương Hữu Đại, Lý Văn Hùng, Lecard Gerard, Lan Hương 'Bông', Đình Hồng, Hoàng Yến, Đỗ Ánh Hồng, Nguyễn Minh Hải, Nguyễn Quang, Hồng Loan, Minh Dũng, Minh Quốc, Chu Phương Thảo...		Intelligence, Period, Biography, Drama	Based on the story life of Miss Indochine Nguyễn Thị Hồng
7-14 Sep	Gửi đến mai sau (To the Future Days)	2 (70′)		Hà Lê Sơn (director); Hà Lê Thu Uyên (writer); Đồng Thu Hà, Trần Lực, Ngọc Thoa, Kim Thoa, Hà Văn Trọng, Hữu Độ, Phú Thăng, Hữu Mười, Thành An, Kim Xuyến, Ngọc Thạc...		Drama, Psychological, Romance	
21-28 Sep	Vụ án chiếc lư đồng (The Copper Censer Case)	2		Linh Đan, Nam Phương (writers); Trần Văn Dũng, Mỹ Duyên, Đinh Thắng, Hồng Đức, Bá Cường, Khánh Việt, Hoàng Dũng, Ngọc Thoa...		Drama, Crime, Post-war	Based on Tôn Ái Nhân's novel 'Oan trái'
5-12 Oct	Cây huê xà (The Snake-flower Tree)	2	Giải Phóng Film & Saigon Film	Xuân Cường (director); Phạm Thùy Nhân (writer); Thương Tín, Lê Bình, Thành Lũy, Tạ Nghi Lễ, Hứa Vĩ Văn, Tường Vân...		Rural, Fantasy, Drama, Romance	Adapted from short story of the same name by Sơn Nam
19 Oct	Bà nội bà ngoại (Grandma & Grandma)	1		Phạm Thanh Phong (director); Hoàng Thị Bích Xuân (writer); Tuyết Mai, Phương Dung, Lệ Hằng, Hải Điệp, Ngọc Tuyết, Hoài Thu, Hữu Thắng, Khánh Ly, Nguyễn Dũng, Thúy Nhàn, Quang Hải, Thành An, Đình Phong, Thúy Trang, Minh Hiếu...		Family, Drama, Scholastic	
26 Oct	Ông Reo xuất ngoại (Outbound Mr. Reo)	1		Nguyễn Hữu Luyện (director); Đinh Tiến (writer); Văn Hiệp...		Comedy	
2-30 Nov	Bác Cả người sung sướng... (Uncle Cả the Joyful Man)	5 (70′)	Đông A Pictures	Trần Lực, Trần Thị Bích Ngọc (director); Lê Công Hội (writer); Khôi Nguyên, Minh Nguyệt, Trần Hạnh, Thanh Hòa, Quang Thiện, Mạnh Tuấn, Bình Trọng, Thanh Giang, Lương Hữu Đại, Ngọc Dung, Phú Đôn, Thu Hường, Hồng Quang, Danh Thái, Thanh Nhàn, Thành An, Hồng Linh, Hán Văn Tình, Quốc Khánh, Thu Quý, Thương An, Kim Thoa, Quốc Hùng, Kim Liên, Thanh Tùng, Xuân Thức, Dũng Nhi, Hồng Chương...	'Bác Cả người sung sướng...' theme song by Nông Xuân Ái	Rural, Drama	
7-14 Dec	Màu sắc phố phường (Colour of the Town)	2		Phạm Hoàng Hà (director & writer); Trần Chí Trung, Diệu Linh, Hoàng Lân...		Drama, Romance, Slice-of-Life	
21 Dec	Đợi (Await)	1 (75′)		Vũ Đình Thân (director); Đoàn Quốc Thắng (writer); Phú Kiên, Lệ My, Xuân Thức, Vân Anh, Diễm Lộc, Hồng Hạnh, Tiến Đại, Minh Hồng, Hồng Điệp, Tiến Mộc, Thái An, Thu Yến...		Drama, Romance	Adapted from short story "Những con sóng đợi mặt trời" by Trịnh Thanh Sơn.
28 Dec 2002- 11 Jan 2003	Đất lạ (Odd Land)	3		Nguyễn Lê Dũng (director); Nguyễn Châu, Bửu Trung, Thanh Thảo, Mỹ Hằng, Yến Vy, Hồ Lệ Thu, Raja Ramani...		Drama	

== VTV3 Sunday Literature & Art dramas ==
These dramas air in early Sunday afternoon on VTV3 as a part of the program Sunday Literature & Art (Vietnamese: Văn nghệ Chủ Nhật).

Broadcast	Title	Eps.	Prod.	Cast and crew	Theme song(s)	Genre	Notes
10 Feb	Mi Nu xinh đẹp (Mellow Minu)	1 (75′)	VTV Film Prod.	Vũ Trường Khoa (director); Nguyễn Thị Thu Huệ (writer); Trung Anh, Huệ Đàn, Thúy Phương, Thúy Ngần, Minh Hằng, Hải Yến, Hoàng Long, Trang Ngân, Hoàng Sơn, Trọng Khoa, Hồng Tám, Duy Từ...		Drama, Family	
17 Feb-16 Jun	Những ngọn nến trong đêm (Candles in the Night)	18 (75′)	VTV Film Prod.	Đỗ Đức Thành, Vũ Hồng Sơn (directors); Đặng Minh Châu (writer); Mai Thu Huyền, Duy Hậu, Thanh Hiền, Bá Anh, Anh Tuấn, Kim Oanh, Quyết Thắng, Mai Ngọc Căn, Lệ Hằng, Thùy Dung, Lệ Thu, Hữu Độ, Ngọc Thoa, Phú Thăng, Phát Triệu, Tuyết Mai, Thu Huyền, Tuyết Liên, Thành An, Hoàng Sơn, Chu Hùng, Minh Phong, Đức Tuệ, Ngọc Huyền, Cường Việt, Tuấn Anh, Minh Hạnh, Đức Long, Lê Thảo, Văn Báu, Hương Dung...	Lời yêu xưa (Old Love Words) by Thương Huyền	Drama, Romance, Crime	Ep 16 & 17 air in Sunday morning at 07:40 & 10:50 respectively due to the broadcast schedule for 2002 FIFA World Cup. It had a sequel aired in weeknight prime-time slot in 2016.
23 Jun-21 Jul	Của chìm của nổi (Hidden Wealth, Material Wealth)	5	VTV Film Prod.	Nguyễn Thế Hồng (director); Nguyễn Ngọc Đức (writer); Mai Ngoc Căn, Ngọc Thoa, Tuyết Liên, Hoàng Thiện, Đức Long, Anh Quân, Thu Hà, Văn Tuấn, Ngọc Huyền, Anh Huy, Ngọc Dung, Ngọc Thư, Hoàng Mai, Hạnh Đạt, Thu Hương, Minh Tuấn, Mai Linh, Thúy Nhàn...	'Của chìm của nổi' theme song by Nguyễn Tuyết Hạnh	Drama, Rural	
28 Jul	Sang sông (Crossing the River)	1 (72′)	VTV Film Prod.	Trọng Trinh (director); Trịnh Thanh Nhã (writer); Minh Châu, Phạm Thị Tần, Tạ Minh Thảo, Đình Chiến, Phú Đôn, Thúy Định, Hồ Hiếu, Trọng Trinh, Quốc Quân, Văn Quỳnh, Lường Thị Nga, Quang Ánh...		Drama, Psychological, Rural, Political	
4 Aug	Nhành lau trắng (White Reed Branch)	1	VTV Film Prod.	Bùi Huy Thuần (director); Nguyễn Thanh Huyền (writer); Thu Trang, Văn Nghĩa, Việt Cầm, Hải Anh, Minh Hằng, Văn Thành, Diệu Thuần, Việt Thắng, Danh Thái, Minh Hoàng, Hòa Thanh, Hương Dung, Văn Kiên, Văn Tâm, Phạm Văn Quỳnh...		Drama, Children	
11-25 Aug	Gái một con (Married, With One Child)	3	VTV Film Prod.	Triệu Tuấn (director); Phạm Văn Khôi (writer); Quốc Tuấn, Lệ Hằng, Mạnh Tưởng, Ngọc Lan, Văn Hiệp, Ngọc Tuyết, Tuyết Liên, Quang Thiện, Quang Thắng, Nguyệt Hằng, Hồng Điệp, Tuấn Anh, Tiến Mộc, Trần Lâu, Lý Công, Đức Toàn, Trần Quỳnh, Đức Anh, Đinh Nhất, Ngọc Anh, Hoài Vi, Thúy Nhung, Văn Thanh, Hồng Phiến, Thùy Liên, Văn Hải, Thanh Hà...		Drama, Marriage, Comedy	
1-8 Sep	Viết tiếp trang gia phả (Genealogy To Go On)	2	VTV Film Prod.	Lê Công Hội (writer); Hạnh Đạt, Thanh Tùng, Bích Ngọc, Hồng Chương, Mai Hương, Phú Đôn, Đinh Nhật, Xuân Hiển, Mai Hoa, Thanh An, Tiến Mạnh...		Family, Drama, Rural	
15 Sep	Báo động (Alert)	1	VTV Film Prod.	Văn Anh Đáng (writer); Minh Tuấn, Hoàng Trung, Văn Chung, Huyền Thanh, Phú Thăng, Trần Đức, Thanh Loan, Trần Thụ, Lan Anh, Hồng Điệp, Thanh Hà...		Drama	
22 Sep-6 Oct	Cựu chiến binh (The Veteran)	3 (75′)	VTV Film Prod.	Đỗ Chí Hướng (director); Lê Công Hội (writer); Khôi Nguyên, Hồng Giang, Minh Thu, Thu Hương, Đức Long, Lê Minh, Thu An, Văn Hiệp, Đức Toàn, Hồ Lan, Lê Đồng, Việt Nga, Mai Hòa, Minh Duyê, Thu Hà, Vũ Lương, Nguyễn Chung, Thúy Hạnh, Sĩ Toàn, Viết Sơn, Đặng Cương...		Drama	
13-20 Oct	Niệm khúc cho người cha (Symphony For The Father)	2 (70′)	VTV Film Prod.	Vũ Hồng Sơn (director); Đoàn Quốc Thắng (writer); Dũng Nhi, Tuấn Hùng, Bá Anh, Lan Hương 'Bông', Hà Miên, Nguyệt Hằng, Hữu Độ, Quốc Quân, Phương Khanh, Mậu Hòa, Quốc Thụ, Minh Phương, Hoàng Mai, Nguyễn Tùng, Lê Hoàng, Đức Trung, Hồng Quang, Nam Cường, Thu Hương, Thùy Dương, Ngọc Minh, Đại Mỹ, Nguyễn Thân, Văn Hải, Tạ Am, Thu Huyền, Lan Phượng, Tuyết Mai, Ngọc Tuấn, Ngọc Long, Minh Phong...	HEART TO HEART by Saiko	Family, Drama, Slice-of-Life, Musical	Adapted from short story of the same name by Bão Vũ
27 Oct-24 Nov	Không gian đa chiều (Multidimensional Space)	5	VTV Film Prod.	Bùi Huy Thuần (director); Đình Kính (writer); Thanh Giang, Tấn Hưng, Hoàng Dũng, Thu Quế, Trần Đức, Lệ Thu, Thanh Tùng, Tuấn Đạt...		Drama, Political	
1 Dec	Không còn gì để nói (Speechless)	1 (90′)	VTV Film Prod.	Nguyễn Khải Hưng (director); Bảo Ninh (writer); Mạnh Cường, Minh Châu, Trần Hạnh, Lê Công Tuấn, Phạm Hồng Minh, Quốc Quân, Thanh Tú, Thành An, Nam Cường, Phương Khanh, Vũ Tăng, Thanh Dương, Quốc Hùng, Hoàng Lân, Nha Trang, Trần Thụ...	Adagio; Composed by Secret Garden	Psychological, Drama, Slice-of-Life	
8-29 Dec	Chớm nắng (Budding Sunshine)	4	VTV Film Prod.	Vũ Minh Trí (director); Đoàn Trúc Quỳnh (writer); Dũng Nhi, Tạ Am, Phạm Bằng, Thu Quế, Đình Chiến, An Chinh, Quang Thắng, Đức Thuận, Thanh Hiền, Khôi Nguyên...		Rural, Drama, Slice-of-Life	Adapted from the novel of the same name by Nguyễn Hữu Nhàn

== For The First Time On VTV3 Screen dramas ==
These dramas air in Sunday night after the 19:00 News Report (aired later or delayed in occasions of special events) under the name of the program For The First Time On VTV3 Screen (Vietnamese: Lần đầu tiên trên màn ảnh VTV3).

- Note: Unlisted airtime periods were spent for special events.

Broadcast	Title	Eps.	Prod.	Cast and crew	Theme song(s)	Genre	Notes
13 Jan-17 Mar	Cảnh sát hình sự: Chuyên án thường nhật (Criminal Police: Daily Specialized Cases)	10	VTV Film Prod.	Various directors; Dương Mạc An Tôn, Thanh Lương, Phạm Hồng Minh, Khánh Ly, Thu Hà, Tố Uyên...	'Chuyên án thường nhật' theme song by Thùy Dung	Crime, Drama	A comeback of Cảnh sát hình sự the series with a new format. 10 episodes is 10 different cases.
24 Mar-2 Jun	Cảnh sát hình sự: Cảnh sát đặc nhiệm (Criminal Police: The Special Force)	10	VTV Film Prod.	Nguyễn Danh Dũng, Trần Hoài Sơn (directors); Hà Văn Trọng, Tạ Minh Thảo, Hoàng Dũng, Tiến Quang, Kiều Minh Hiếu, Mỹ Linh, Vĩnh Xương, Trí Đức, Uy Linh, Thanh Giang, Phát Triệu, Tuyết Mai, Duy Thanh, Hoàng Yến, Minh Phương, Xuân Tùng, Hồ Lan, Cường Việt, Hữu Độ...	Những bàn chân lặng lẽ (Quiet Steps) by Thùy Dung	Crime, Drama	Following the format of Chuyên án thường nhật a.k.a. Cảnh sát hình sự II. Delay 1 ep on 21 Apr.
9 Jun	Tôi đưa em sang sông (Taking You Across the River)	1		Nguyễn Hữu Luyện (director); Thu Hương (writer); Trần Tùng, Phát Triệu, Tuyết Mai, Công Lý...		Drama	
16 Jun-11 Aug	Bức tường lửa (The Fire Wall)	18 (30′)	VTV and TĐN	Lê Ngọc Linh (director); Nguyễn Khắc Phục (writer)	'Bức tường lửa' theme song Composed by Đặng Hữu Phúc	Drama	Airs 2 episodes per night
18 Aug	Followed by the playback of Biến động ngày hè (Summer Day Upheaval), 2 episodes back-to-back. The drama was first released on VTV1 channel in 1996.						
1-15 Sep	Followed by the playback of Vết thương ngày cũ (The Wound From the Old Days), 3 episodes. The drama was first released on THTPCT channel.						
6 Oct-3 Nov	Followed by the playback of Ngọt ngào và man trá (Sweet and Falsehoods), 3 episodes. The drama was first released on VTV3 channel in 1996. *Note: Delay 2 times on 20 & 27 Oct						
10 Nov 2002- 5 Jan 2003	Cảnh sát hình sự: Cổ cồn trắng (Criminal Police: White Collar)	10	VTV Film Prod.	Trần Hoài Sơn (director); Nguyễn Như Phong (writer); Phạm Cường, An Chinh, Hà Văn Trọng, Thế Bình, Hồng Đức, Anh Dũng, Hồng Tuấn, Hoàng Tuấn, Quốc Huy, Duy Thanh, Công Lý, Nguyễn Chung, Cường Việt, Đức Long, Trần Đức, Tiến Đạt, Mậu Hòa, Phát Triệu, Lê Quốc Thắng, Lệ Hằng, Thanh Tú, Ngọc Thư, Xuân Thức, Tuấn Dương...	Những bàn chân lặng lẽ (Quiet Steps) by Thùy Dung	Crime, Drama, Political	a.k.a. Cảnh sát hình sự III. Adapted from novel of the same name by Nguyễn Như Phong. Air 2 eps per night from 8 to 22 Dec (Ep 3–8). Delay 2 times on 24 Nov & 1 Dec.

== See also ==
- List of dramas broadcast by Vietnam Television (VTV)
- List of dramas broadcast by Hanoi Radio Television (HanoiTV)
- List of dramas broadcast by Vietnam Digital Television (VTC)
