= Hanoi Radio Television =

Vietnamese radio and television network

- Type: Multimedia
- Country: Vietnam
- Headquarters: 3–5 Huỳnh Thúc Kháng street, Láng ward, Hanoi, Vietnam
- Owner: Hanoi People’s Committee
- Key people: Nguyễn Kim Khiêm (editor-in-chief)
- Launch date: 14 October 1954; 72 years ago
- Dissolved: 30 January 2026
- Official website: Official website
- Language: Vietnamese
- Replaced by: Hanoi Media Group

Hanoi Radio Television (Vietnamese: Đài Phát thanh – Truyền hình Hà Nội, lit. 'Station of Radio and Television of Hanoi'), colloquially in Vietnamese Đài Hà Nội (lit. '[Radio and Television] Station of Hanoi'), was the official radio and television network of Hanoi, Vietnam. Its headquarters was located on Huỳnh Thúc Kháng street, Láng ward, Hanoi, which represented its network logo.

== History ==
Hanoi Radio Television was established on October 14, 1954, four days after the capital was liberated. A fixed radio station was installed at Thủy Tạ Information – Exhibition House with simple technical facilities, laying the foundation for the later development of Hanoi Radio Television.

In October 1977, celebrating the 23rd Capital Liberation Day and the station's founding anniversary,

At 14:00 on January 1, 1979, the first Hanoi television program was broadcast on Vietnam Television with a new image and the familiar "Hanoi people" song used as intro music.

On August 25, 1989, the Hanoi City People's Committee issued a decision to change the name of Hanoi Radio Station to Hanoi Radio Television, recognizing the Station as the city's audio and video media outlet.

One year later, on July 14, 1990, the Ministry of Culture and Information licensed Hanoi Radio Television to broadcast the television program in the morning. It has gradually affirmed its position in the national press system.

On 30 January 2026, Hanoi Radio Television merged with five other media outlets of Hanoi to form Hanoi Media Group.

== See also ==
- List of programmes broadcast by Hanoi Radio Television
